= Woking =

Town and borough in Surrey, England

Woking Borough of Woking
- Town and non-metropolitan borough
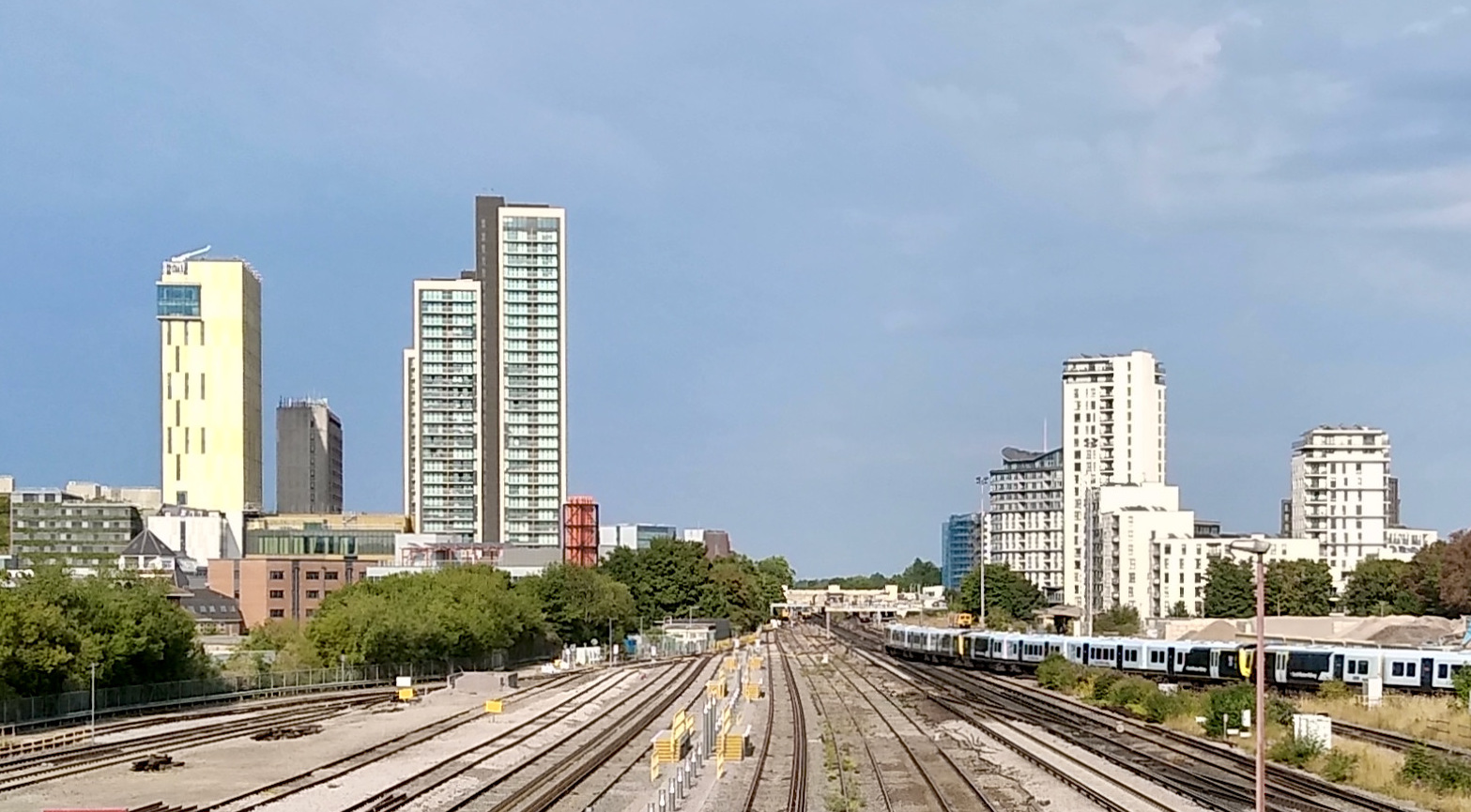
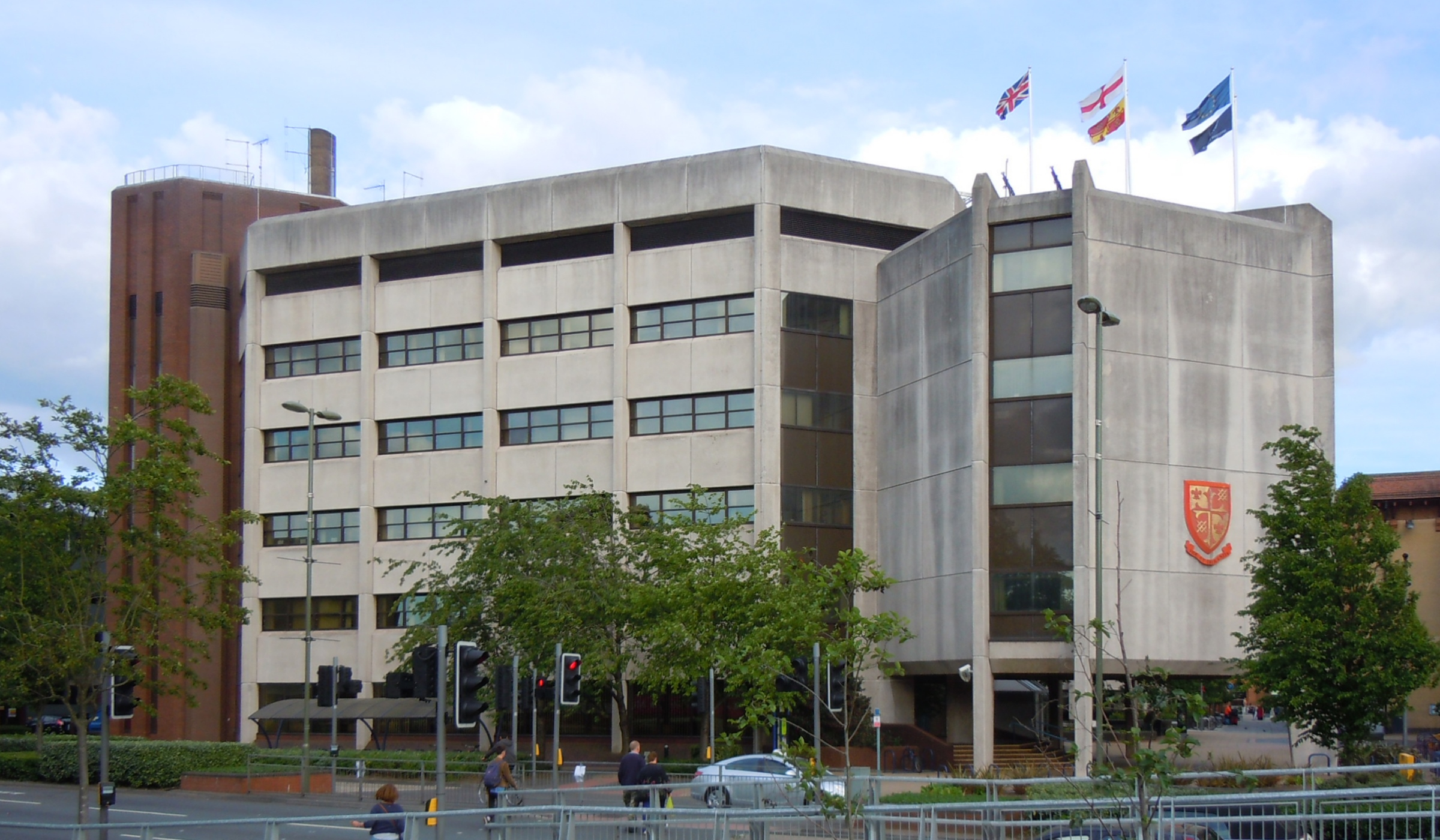
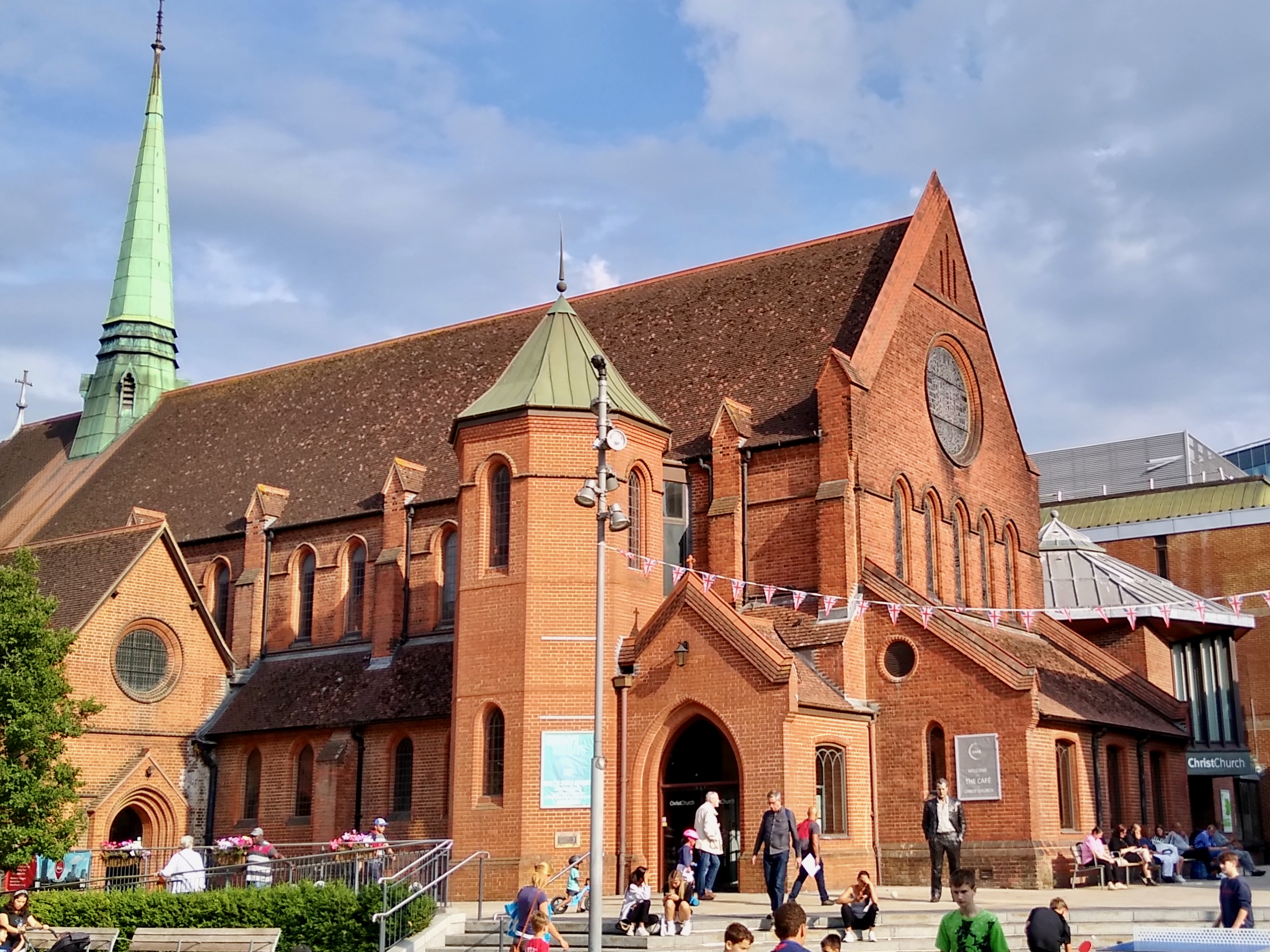
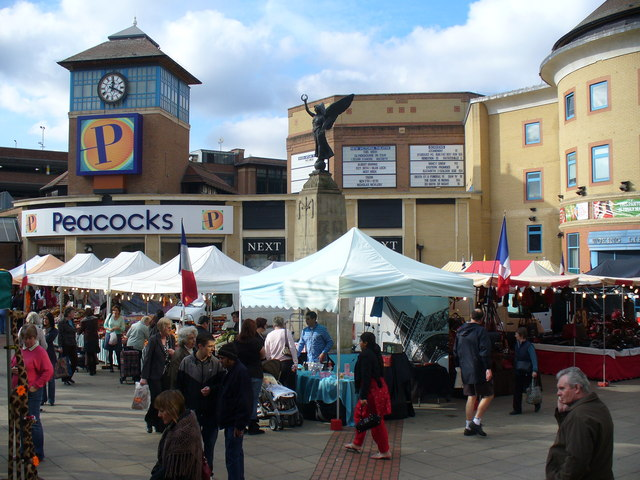
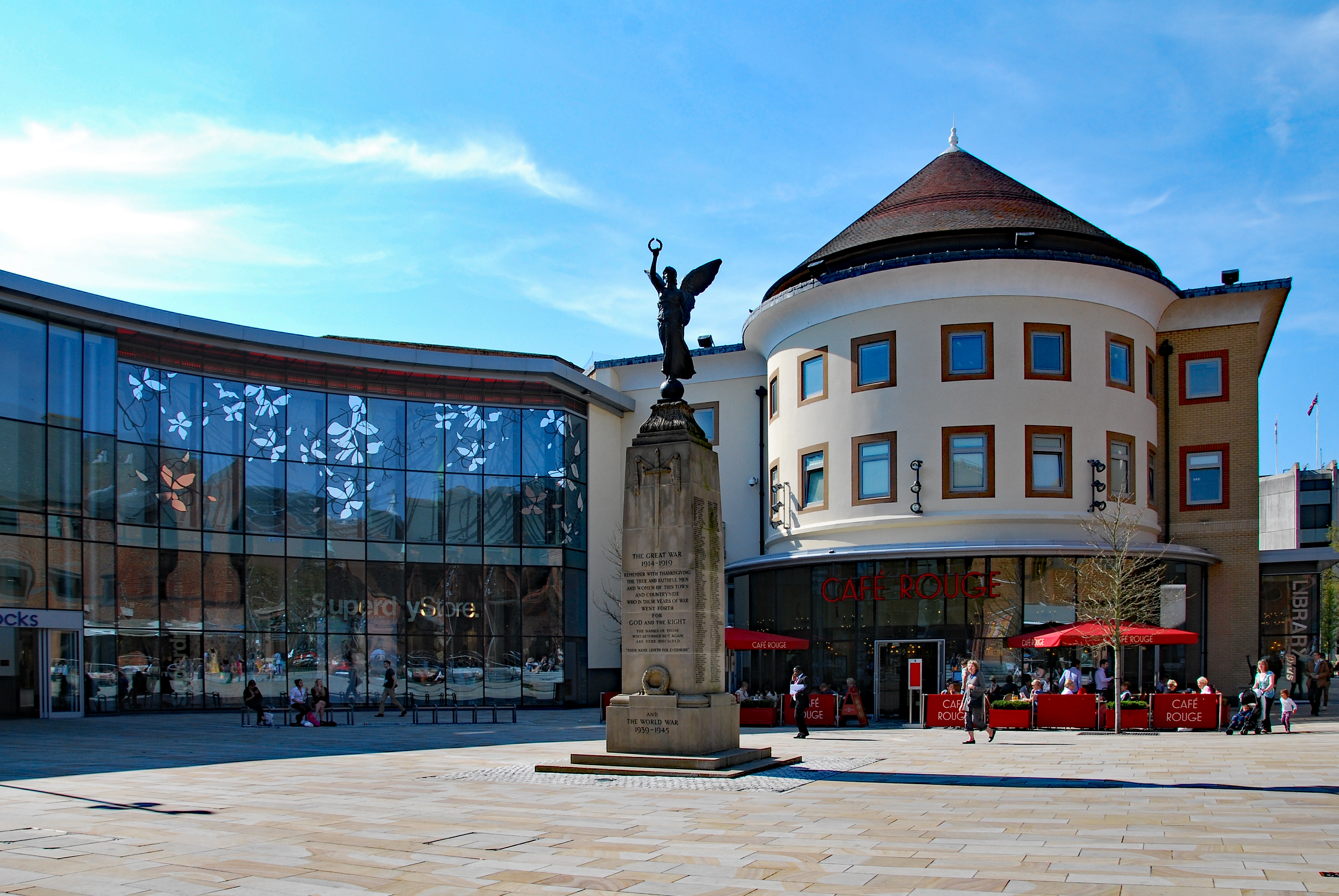
- View of Central Woking from the west Civic Offices Christ Church Victoria Place Jubilee Square
- Motto: Fide et Diligentia (Latin for 'By faith and diligence')
- The Borough of Woking in Surrey
- Coordinates: 51°19′13″N 00°33′24″W
- Sovereign state: United Kingdom
- Constituent country: England
- Region: South East England
- Non-metropolitan county: Surrey
- Status: Non-metropolitan district
- Admin HQ: Woking
- Incorporated: 1 April 1974

Government
  - Type: Non-metropolitan district council
  - Body: Woking Borough Council
  - Leadership: Leader & Cabinet
  - MPs: Will Forster (Liberal Democrats)

Area
  - Total: 24.6 sq mi (63.6 km^{2})
  - Rank: 232nd (of 296)

Population (2021)
  - Total: 103,900 (estimated)
  - Rank: 234th (of 296)
  - Density: 4,230/sq mi (1,630/km^{2})

Ethnicity (2021)
  - Ethnic groups: List: 78.4% White; 14.2% Asian; 3.5% Mixed; 2.1% other; 1.8% Black

Religion (2021)
  - Religion: List: 47.6% Christianity; 33.3% no religion; 9.4% Islam; 5.8% not stated; 2.4% Hinduism; 0.6% Buddhism; 0.5% other; 0.3% Sikhism; 0.2% Judaism
- Time zone: UTC0 (GMT)
  - Summer (DST): UTC+1 (BST)
- ONS code: 43UM (ONS); E07000217 (GSS)
- OS grid reference: TQ0040358550
- Website: www.woking.gov.uk

Woking (/ˈwoʊkɪŋ/ WOH-king) is a town and borough in north-west Surrey, England, around 23 mi (36 km) from central London. It appears in Domesday Book as Wochinges, and its name probably derives from that of a Saxon landowner. The earliest evidence of human activity is from the Palaeolithic, but the low fertility of the sandy local soils meant that the area was the least populated part of the county in 1086. Between the mid-17th and mid-19th centuries, new transport links were constructed, including the Wey Navigation, Basingstoke Canal and London to Southampton railway line. The modern town was established in the mid-1860s, as the London Necropolis Company began to sell surplus land surrounding the railway station for development.

Modern local government in Woking began with the creation of the Woking Local Board in 1893, which became Woking Urban District Council (UDC) in 1894. The urban district was significantly enlarged in 1907 when it took in the parish of Horsell, and again in 1933 when it took in the parishes of Byfleet and Pyrford. The UDC was granted a coat of arms in 1930 and Woking gained borough status in the 1974 reorganisation of local government. In 2022, a total of 30 elected representatives serves on the council, each with a term length of four years.

The Borough of Woking covers 64 km^{2} (25 sq mi) and had a population of 103,900 in 2021. The main urban centre stretches from Knaphill in the west to Byfleet in the east, but the satellite villages of Brookwood, Mayford, Pyrford and Old Woking retain strong individual identities. Around 60% of the borough is protected by the Metropolitan Green Belt, which severely limits the potential for further housebuilding. Recent developments have included the construction of two residential tower blocks in the town centre and the conversion of former industrial buildings to apartments. There are six Sites of Special Scientific Interest within the borough boundaries, of which three form part of the Thames Basin Heaths Special Protection Area.

Almost the entire town centre dates from the 20th and 21st centuries. Elsewhere in the borough, there are several historic buildings, including the ruins of Woking Palace, a royal residence of Henry VII and Henry VIII. Parts of St Peter's Church in Old Woking date from the reign of William I and Sutton Place, built for Richard Weston c. 1525, is one of the earliest unfortified houses in England. The Shah Jahan Mosque, constructed in 1889, was the first purpose-built Muslim place of worship in the UK. There are numerous works of public art in the town centre, including a statue of the author, H. G. Wells, who wrote The War of the Worlds while living in Maybury Road. Much of the novel is set in the Woking area.

== Toponymy ==
The earliest surviving record of Woking is from Domesday Book of 1086, in which the manor appears as Wochinges. In the 12th century, it is recorded as Wokinges, Wokkinges, Wokinge and Wochinga. The "monastery at Wocchingas" is mentioned in a c. 1200 copy of an early 8th-century letter from Pope Constantine to Hedda, Abbot of Bermondsey and Woking. (Note: There is some doubt as to the accuracy and authenticity of Medieval copies of earlier Anglo-Saxon documents.) The first part of the name "Woking" is thought to refer to an Anglo-Saxon individual, who may have been called "Wocc" or "Wocca". The second part is derived from the Old English -ingas and means "people of" or "family of". (Note: The same personal name "Wocc" or "Wocca" also occurs in the toponym of Wokingham, around 15 mi (24 km) to the north-west of Woking. It has been suggested that in early Anglo-Saxon times, the land between the two towns was under the control of the same tribe, the Wocchingas. However, there is no written, historical evidence for the Wocchingas and the Surrey—Berkshire county boundary, which would cut through the middle of their supposed territory, dates back to the early Saxon period. It may, therefore, be a coincidence that the same or similar personal names appear in the toponyms of the two towns.)

== Geography ==
=== Borough of Woking ===
The Borough of Woking covers an area of 64 km^{2} (25 sq mi) in north-west Surrey. Woking town, the main population centre, is surrounded by smaller, distinct settlements, such as West Byfleet and Byfleet in the east and Knaphill to the west. The villages of Brookwood and Mayford retain strong individual identities and lie just outside the primary built-up area of the borough.

Around 60% of the land in the borough is part of the Metropolitan Green Belt, which severely limits the potential for urban expansion. Of the six Sites of Special Scientific Interest, five are areas of heathland and the sixth covers the majority of the Basingstoke Canal. (Note: Three Site of Special Scientific Interest in the Borough of Woking also form part of the Thames Basin Heaths Special Protection Area. The three sites are: Horsell Common, Sheet's Heath and Brookwood Heath.)

=== Woking town centre ===
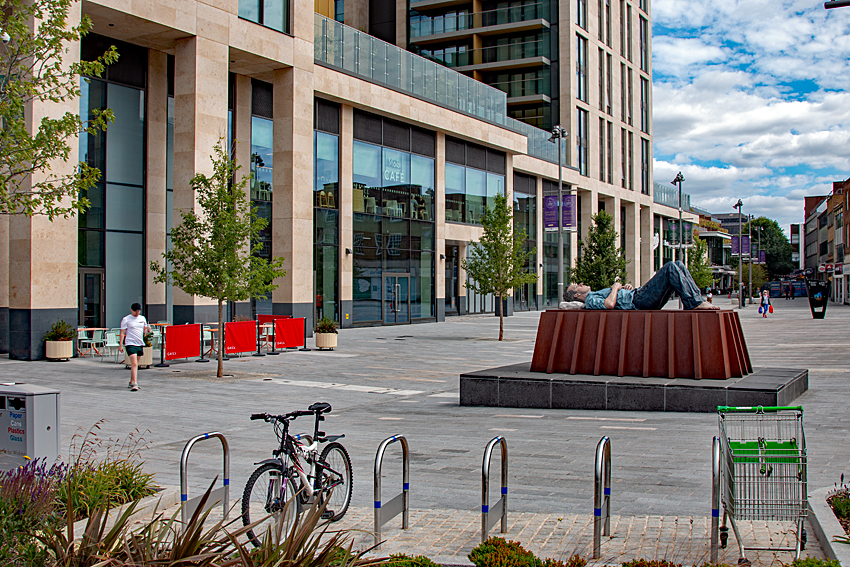
Victoria Square, Woking

Woking town centre is around 23 mi (36 km) from central London. It covers an area of about 50 ha (120 acres) to the north and south of the station, although the primary shopping and office spaces are between the railway line and the Basingstoke Canal. The two main shopping centres, Victoria Place and Peacocks Shopping Centre, adjoin Jubilee Square. A second public space, Victoria Square, was completed in 2022 as part of a project to construct two high-rise residential apartment blocks and a 23-storey hotel.

=== Old Woking ===
Old Woking, around 1 mi (1.6 km) south of the town centre, close to the River Wey, is the location of the original settlement of the manor of Woking. The village is thought to have grown as an unplanned settlement surrounding St Peter's Church, parts of which date from the 11th century. The basic street layout is likely to have been established in medieval times, and there was a period of strong growth following the grant of a market in 1662. The settlement expanded north-wards during the interwar period, and Old Woking is now contiguous with the main urban area of the borough.

=== Hydrology and geology ===
The majority of the borough is drained by the River Wey, which flows along the southeastern boundary of the borough, from Jacobs Well to Byfleet. The Hoe Stream, which joins the Wey near Pyrford Village, runs from Fox Corner through Mayford. (Note: Between 2010 and 2012, a £44M project was undertaken to reduce the flood risk from the Hoe Stream. New flood defences were constructed to protect a total of 260 properties, and a housing development site for 150 new homes was created.) The Basingstoke Canal runs from west to east, broadly following the course of the partly culverted Rive Ditch, and the northern part of the borough is drained by the tributaries of the River Bourne. There have been major flooding events in Woking in 1968, 2000, 2014 and 2016.

The strata on which the borough sits were deposited in the Cenozoic. The sandy Bagshot Beds are the main outcrop around the town centre and to the north. In the west of the borough, around Knaphill and Brookwood, are the younger Bracklesham Beds. The Bracklesham Beds have a higher clay content than the Bagshot Beds, and brickmaking has historically taken place at Knaphill. The River Wey primarily runs across alluvium and the settlements of Old Woking and West Byfleet are built on river gravels.

== History ==
=== Early history ===
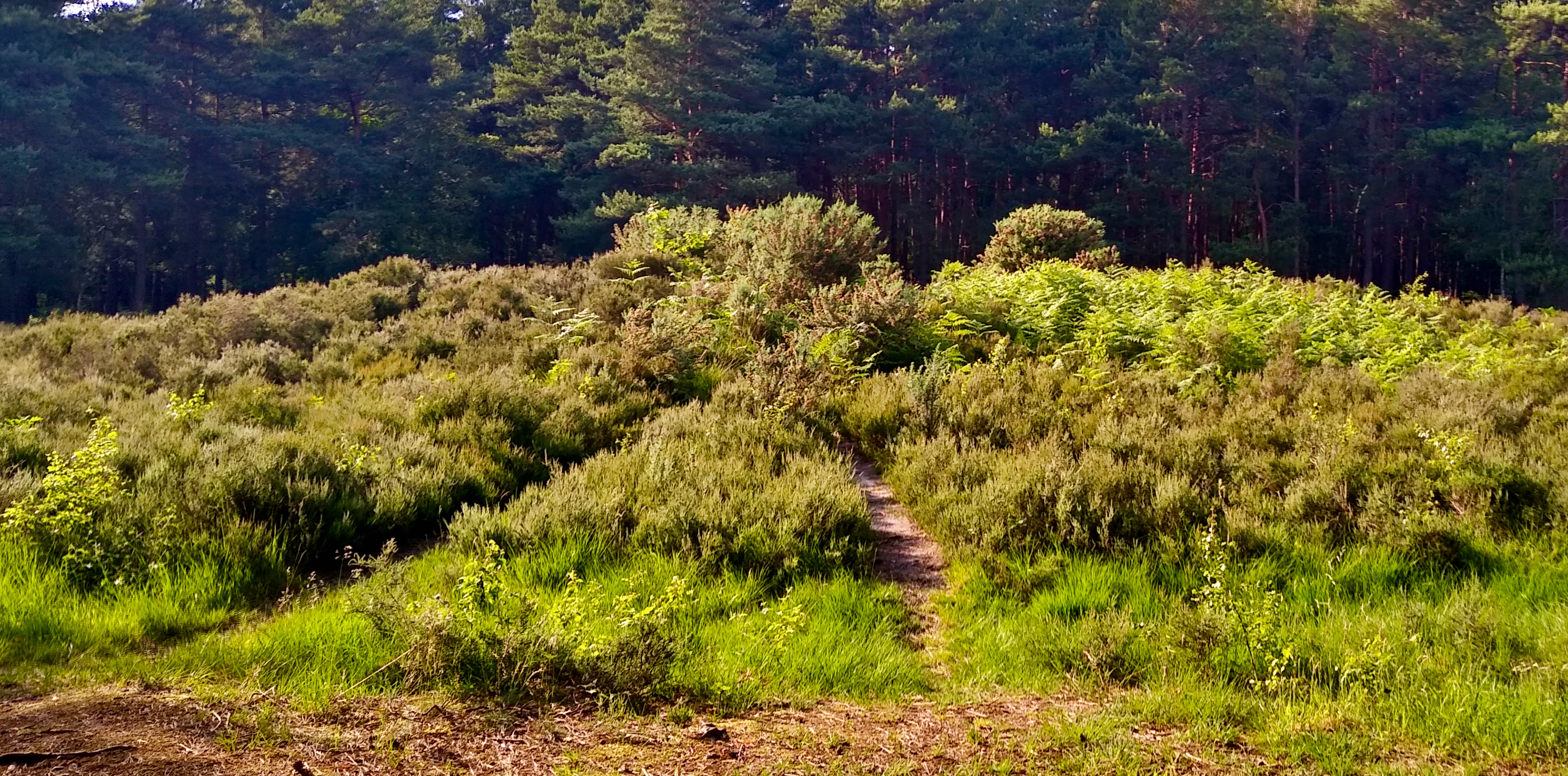
The westernmost Bronze Age bell barrow on Horsell Common

The earliest evidence of human activity in the Woking area is from the Palaeolithic. Flints dated to c. 13000 years before present (BP) have been found at Horsell, and knife blades from c. 12000 – c. 11000 BP have been discovered at Pyrford. Two bell barrows and a disc barrow at Horsell are thought to date from the early Bronze Age. Pollen samples taken from the westernmost barrow suggest that the local environment at the time of construction was predominantly open heathland with some areas of deciduous woodland. (Note: As part of a study published in 2014, pollen grains from common heather, hazel, oak, alder and birch species were identified in the turf stack at the base of the westernmost barrow.) Aerial photographs suggest that there may have been field systems on Horsell Common, Smarts Heath and Whitmoor Common in the same period, although the local soils are relatively infertile and could not have sustained the farming practices of the time for very long.

Roman occupation in the borough appears to have been concentrated in the Old Woking and Mayford areas. The sites excavated to date show evidence of low-status dwellings, possibly connected to iron working and pottery making. Roman tiles can be found in the lower part of the tower of St Peter's Church.

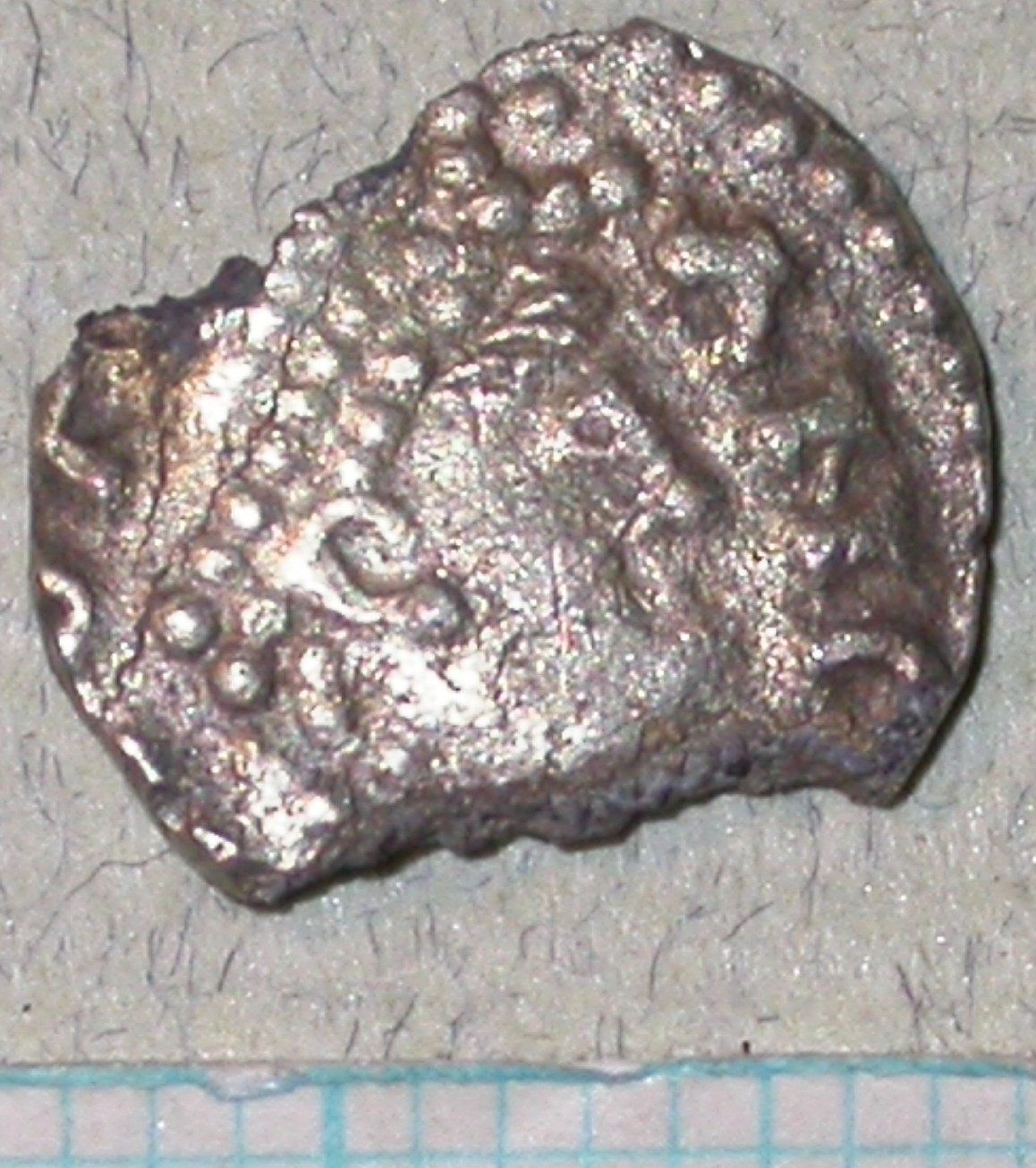
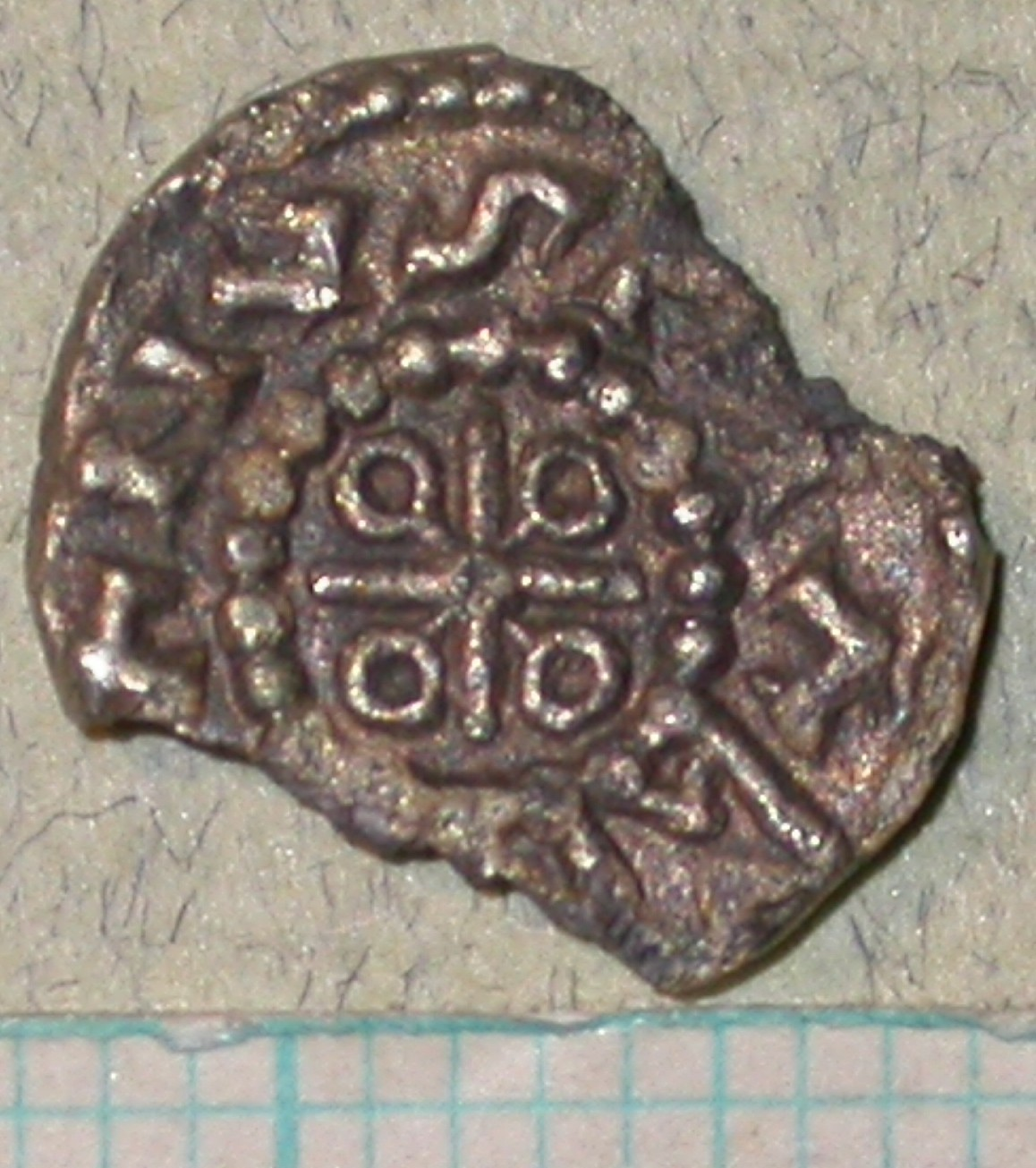
The front (left) and back faces of an Anglo-Saxon sceat coin, found at Pyrford in 1997 and minted c. 675 – c. 680

The division of Surrey into hundreds from c. 800

The earliest documented reference to Woking suggests that there was a religious foundation in the area in the early 8th century. Around this time, the settlement was the administrative centre for north-west Surrey, with its western border as the watershed between the Rivers Mole and Wey and its southern border as the North Downs. By 775, there was a minster in Woking, which may be the forerunner of St Peter's Church and by the mid-late 9th century, the settlement was the centre of a royal vill. Towards the end of the Saxon period, Surrey was divided into hundreds, of which Woking Hundred was one.

=== Governance ===
Woking appears in Domesday book as Wochinges. In 1086, it was partly held by William I and partly by two lesser tenants of the Bishop of Exeter. Together the two holdings had sufficient land for 15 1/2 ploughteams, 46 acres (19 ha) of meadow and woodland for 160 swine. Between them, the manors had two mills and one church, and the settlement was among the largest 20% of those recorded in the country in 1086.

Three other manors in the modern borough are listed in Domesday Book: Byfleet and Pyrford were held by the abbeys of Chertsey and Westminster respectively; Sutton was held by Durand Malet as lesser tenant and by Robert Malet as tenant-in-chief. (Note: There is no entry for Horsell in Domesday Book and it was probably considered as part of Pyrford in 1086.)

Woking was held by the Crown until 1189, when Richard I granted it to Alan Basset, who later received the manor of Sutton from King John. Woking was inherited by his descendants until it passed, through marriage, to Hugh le Despenser. It remained in the Despenser family until 1326 when it was granted to Edmund Holland, the fourth Earl of Kent. In the mid-15th century, the manor was inherited by Margaret Beauchamp. It was briefly held by the Crown before it was passed to her daughter, Margaret Beaufort, in 1466. On her death in 1509, Woking was inherited by her grandson, the future Henry VIII. James I sold the manor to Edward Zouch, but it reverted to the Crown in 1671. In 1752, it was bought by Richard Onslow, the third Baron Onslow and remained in his family's possession until the mid-19th century.

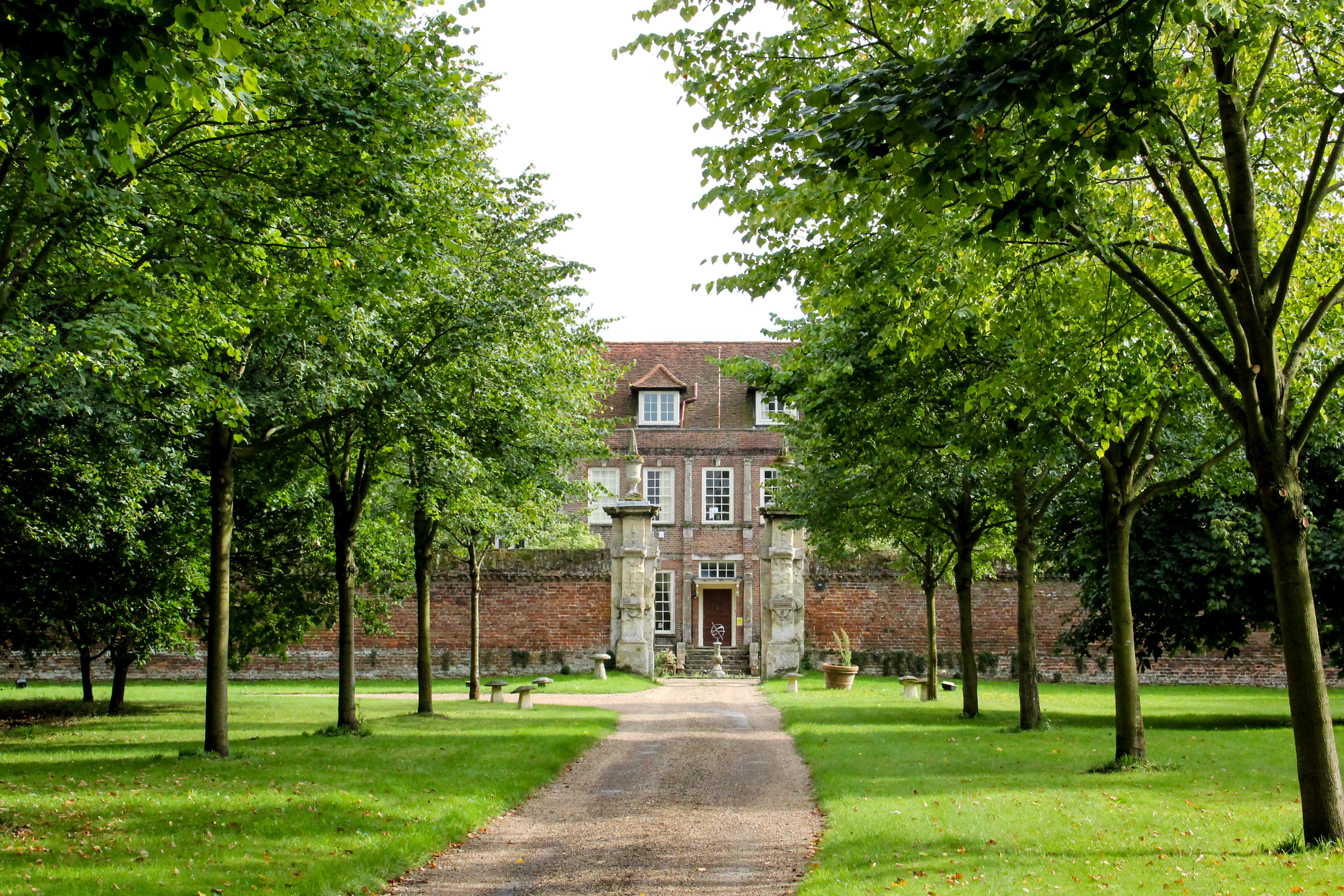
The walls surrounding Byfleet Manor date from the early 17th century.

Byfleet became a royal property at the start of the 14th century. Edward II granted it to Piers Gaveston, but following Gaveston's downfall in 1312, it reverted to the Crown. Anne of Denmark, wife of King James I was the manor's last royal owner and thereafter it was held by a series of private individuals. The current manor house dates from 1686, but it was restored and extended in 1905.

Pyrford was held by Westminster Abbey until the dissolution of the monasteries when it became the property of the Crown. Elizabeth I granted the manor to Edward Clinton, the first Earl of Lincoln in 1574 and it was sold repeatedly until the mid-17th century. In 1677, Richard Onslow, the first Baron Onslow purchased Pyrford, and it was owned by his family until 1805.

Reforms during the Tudor period reduced the importance of manorial courts and the day-to-day administration of towns became the responsibility of local vestries. By this time, the modern Borough of Woking was divided between four parishes: Woking, Byfleet, Horsell and Pyrford. The vestries appointed constables, distributed funds to the poor and took charge of the repair of local roads. From the 17th century, the roles of Justices of the Peace were expanded to take greater responsibility for law and order in the area.

Following the Poor Law Amendment Act 1834, the parish of Woking was included in the Guildford Poor Law Union, whilst the parishes of Byfleet, Horsell, and Pyrford were included in the Chertsey Poor Law Union. These unions then formed the basis for the rural sanitary districts established in 1872, which gradually took on more local government responsibilities. Surrey County Council was established in 1889 under the Local Government Act 1888 to operate as a higher-tier authority alongside the sanitary districts. In 1893 a separate local board was established for the parish of Woking, making it its own urban sanitary district, independent from the Guildford Rural Sanitary District. After elections, the first meeting of the Woking Local Board was held on 4 October 1893.

Under the Local Government Act 1894, the Woking Local Board became an urban district council (UDC). Byfleet, Horsell and Pyrford became part of the Chertsey Rural District, although the parish of Horsell was transferred into the Woking Urban District in 1907, It was not until 1933, when the Chertsey Rural District was abolished, that both Byfleet and Pyrford joined the Woking Urban District. (Note: After 1933, the four civil parishes in Woking Urban District were Byfleet, Horsell, Pyrford and Woking. These "urban parishes" did not have parish councils of their own, with Woking Urban District Council being the lowest level representative body. Under Section 1 of the Local Government Act 1894, only parishes in rural districts were given parish councils.) The council was granted a coat of arms in 1930 and three years later it applied to the Privy Council for borough status, but without success. A similar request made in 1955 was also declined. It was not until the 1974 reorganisation of local government that Woking finally became a borough. The parishes within the borough were abolished at the same time, making it an unparished area.

A civil parish council for Byfleet was created in 1990, but was abolished in April 2010. As of 2022, there are no parish councils in the borough.

=== Transport and communications ===
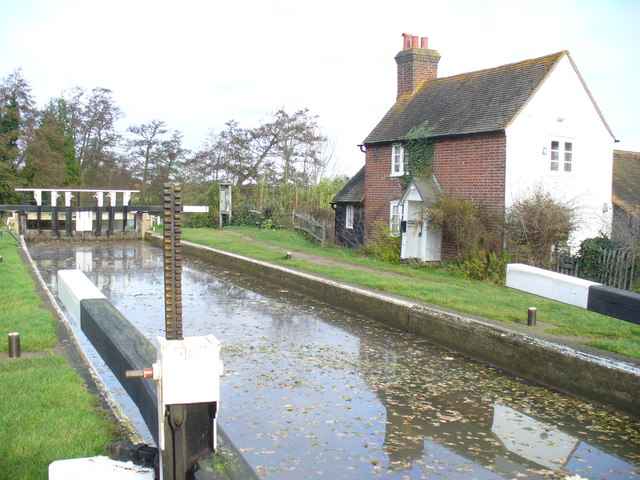
Triggs Lock, River Wey Navigation

The unimproved River Wey is thought to have been used for the transport of goods and passengers from ancient times. In the early Tudor period, there was a wharf at Woking Palace and in 1566 there is a reference to a "certaein locke... between Woodham lands and Brook lande upon the water of the Weye". The River Wey Navigation was first authorised by an act of the Commonwealth Parliament in 1651. Twelve locks (including two flood locks), and 9 mi (14 km) of new cuts were constructed between the Thames and Guildford, of which three are in the borough. The opening of the new navigation had a modest effect on the local area, and, by the 18th century, flour produced by watermills at Woking was being shipped to London from a new wharf at Cartbridge near Send.

The Basingstoke Canal was authorised by the Basingstoke Canal Act 1778 (18 Geo. 3. c. 75) and was intended to provide a route for the transport of farm produce and timber from Hampshire to London. The section between the Wey Navigation and Horsell opened in 1791 and the canal was finally completed in 1794. Although the route was too far from Old Woking for it to have an effect on its development, a wharf was provided at Horsell for the use of local farmers. In the first half of the 19th century, bricks were manufactured in the area now occupied by Goldsworth Road and were transported to London via a wharf adjacent to the Rowbarge pub. The canal declined sharply after the opening of the London and Southampton Railway in the late 1830s and traffic west of Woking had ceased by 1921. The final commercial delivery, a consignment of timber to Woking, was made via the canal in 1947. By the mid-1960s, the canal was derelict, but between 1970 and 1976 it was purchased by Surrey and Hampshire county councils. Restoration of the canal was completed in 1991 and the canal is now open for navigation from the Wey to the eastern portal of Greywell Tunnel. (Note: Locks 6 to 14 (the top lock of the Woodham Flight in the east to the top lock of the Brookwood Flight in the west) are in the Borough of Woking.)

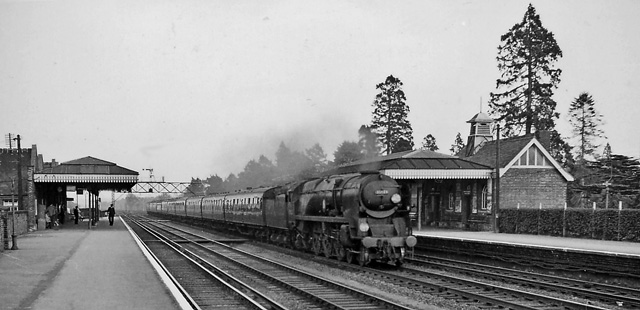
A Merchant Navy class steam locomotive hauls an express passenger train through Brookwood in 1961.

The construction of the London and Southampton Railway began in October 1834 and the first train ran between Nine Elms and Woking on 12 May 1838. (Note: Woking station, initially known as Woking Common, was built with two platforms linked by a footbridge and was the terminus of the line until the section to Winchfield opened in September 1838.) When it opened, Woking station was surrounded by open heath and was 2 km (1.2 mi) from what is now the village of Old Woking. Nevertheless, it quickly became the railhead for west Surrey and the main entrance was positioned on the south side of the tracks for the convenience of those travelling by stagecoach from Guildford. The station became a junction in May 1845 when the branch to Guildford was opened. Three other railway stations were built in the present borough: Brookwood (opened in June 1864), Worplesdon (opened in March 1883) and West Byfleet (opened in December 1887 as Byfleet). The track through Woking station was quadrupled in 1904 and electrified in 1937.

The London Necropolis Company was established by the London Necropolis and National Mausoleum Act 1852 (15 & 16 Vict. c. cxlix) to create Brookwood Cemetery. New burials had been banned in central London graveyards in 1850, and the company was able to purchase 2,268 acres (918 ha) of common land in the Woking area in 1854. The cemetery was consecrated by the Bishop of Winchester in November 1854. Coffins were transported to Brookwood by train and the cemetery was served by a short single-track branch line with two stations. The company ran funeral trains to Brookwood at least twice a week until April 1941, when the London terminus was bombed.

=== Residential development ===
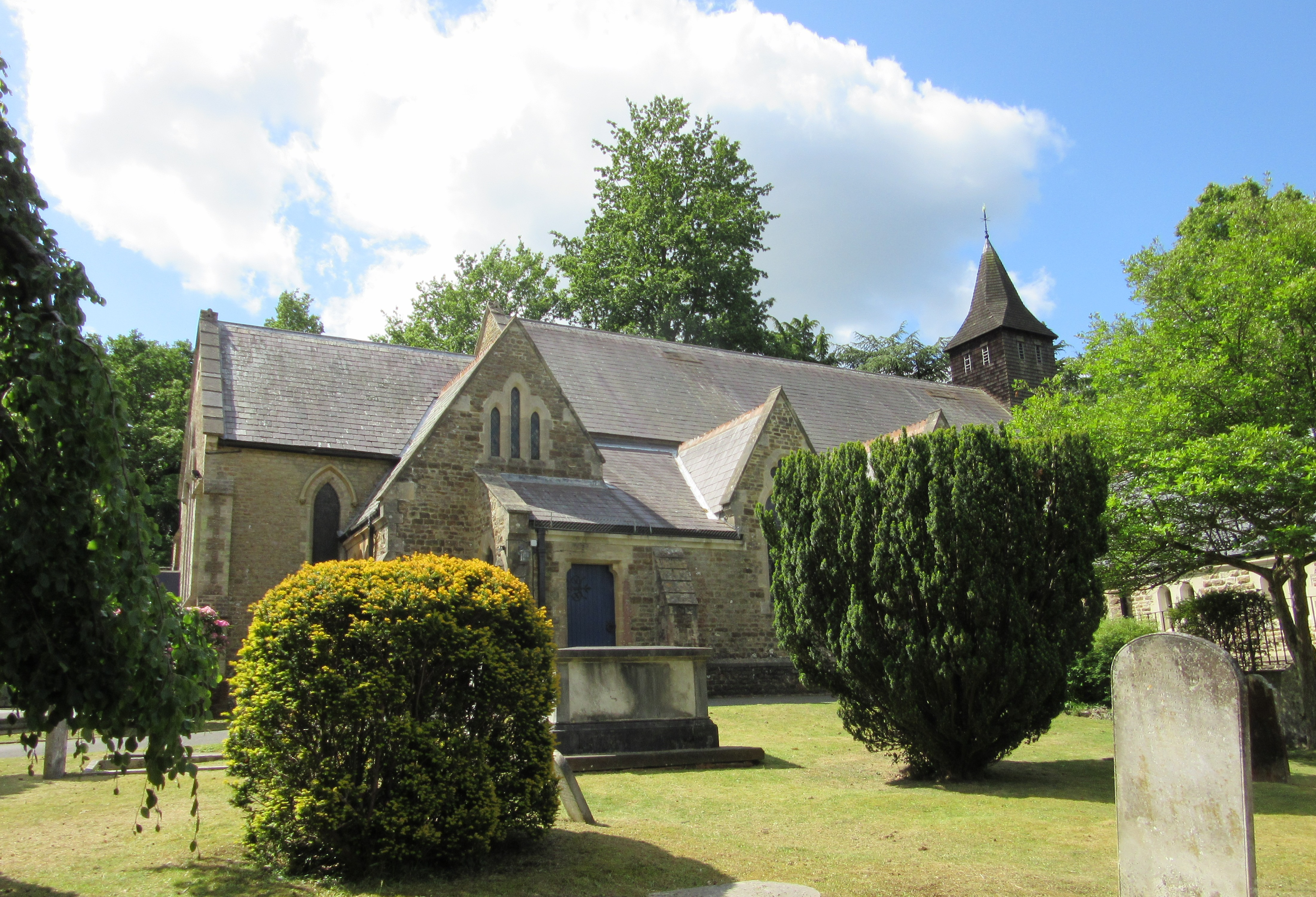
St John's Church, St John's

Construction of St John's, the only significant area where housebuilding was directly stimulated by the opening of the Basingstoke Canal, began in the first decades of the 19th century. In the 1790s, there had been a few scattered smallholdings and squatters' cottages to the south of Knaphill, but the opening of a wharf to serve the nurseries and new brickworks attracted new workers, requiring more extensive accommodation. By the late 1830s, the new village, initially known as Kiln Bridge, was large enough to support the construction of a chapel dedicated to St John the Baptist. The chapel was replaced by a larger church, designed by George Gilbert Scott and consecrated in 1842, and the surrounding area acquired the name "St John's" at around the same time. Further expansion in the area continued with the opening of the Woking Convict Invalid Prison and Brookwood Hospital in the mid-19th century.

Modern Woking began to develop between the mid-1860s and late-1880s, as the London Necropolis Company sold excess land that had not been used for Brookwood Cemetery. (Note: The Necropolis Company was authorised by an 1855 Act of Parliament to sell any land not required for Brookwood Cemetery. Initial interest was low and by 1864, only 343 acres (139 ha) had been sold, of which 41 acres (17 ha), south of the railway station, had been purchased by the Raistrick family. Plans drawn up by the company in 1959 indicate the favoured location of the new town centre was to be north of the railway, with the High Street running parallel to the tracks.) The High Street had been laid out by 1863, and a post office opened there in 1865. By 1869, the first houses had appeared on Ellen Street (now West Street), Providence Street (now Church Street) and Commercial Road. By the 1890s, most of the land to the north of the railway line had been sold, but the London Necropolis Company had been unable to find a buyer for Hook Heath, to the south. The company decided to develop the area itself and divided it into plots for large, detached houses. A golf course was built on part of the heath to attract residents and visitors. (Note: The London Necropolis Company earned additional revenue from golfers disguised as mourners taking advantage of the Necropolis Railway's fixed cheap fares to travel from London to the golf course, a practice which was tacitly accepted by the company. How the golfers concealed their equipment while travelling is not recorded.)

The first council housing in Woking was constructed following the end of the First World War, and by the summer of 1921, around 100 families had moved into new properties in Old Woking, Horsell, Knaphill and Westfield. In the same year, Chertsey Rural District Council developed their own schemes in Byfleet and Pyrford, and, in the two decades to 1939, Woking UDC constructed a total of 785 houses. Following the end of the Second World War, the borough council began to build estates at Maybury, Barnsbury and St Mary's Byfleet.

In the 1944 Greater London Plan, Pyrford and Byfleet were identified as areas for overspill development and homes for 3,250 former London residents were expected to be built in the borough. In 1947, London County Council purchased 230 acres (93 ha) at Sheerwater and by 1951 had constructed 1,279 houses and flats for new tenants. (Note: Originally the Sheerwater area was a large natural lake. It was drained in the 1820s by the landowner, Lord Peter King, who established a plantation of pine trees in its place.) In 1965, much of the remaining open space in the borough was placed into the Metropolitan Green Belt, restricting the potential for future development of greenfield land. Nevertheless, housebuilding continued in the 1970s, including the 20 ha (49-acre) Lakeview development and the construction of 440 homes on the former Inkerman Barracks site.

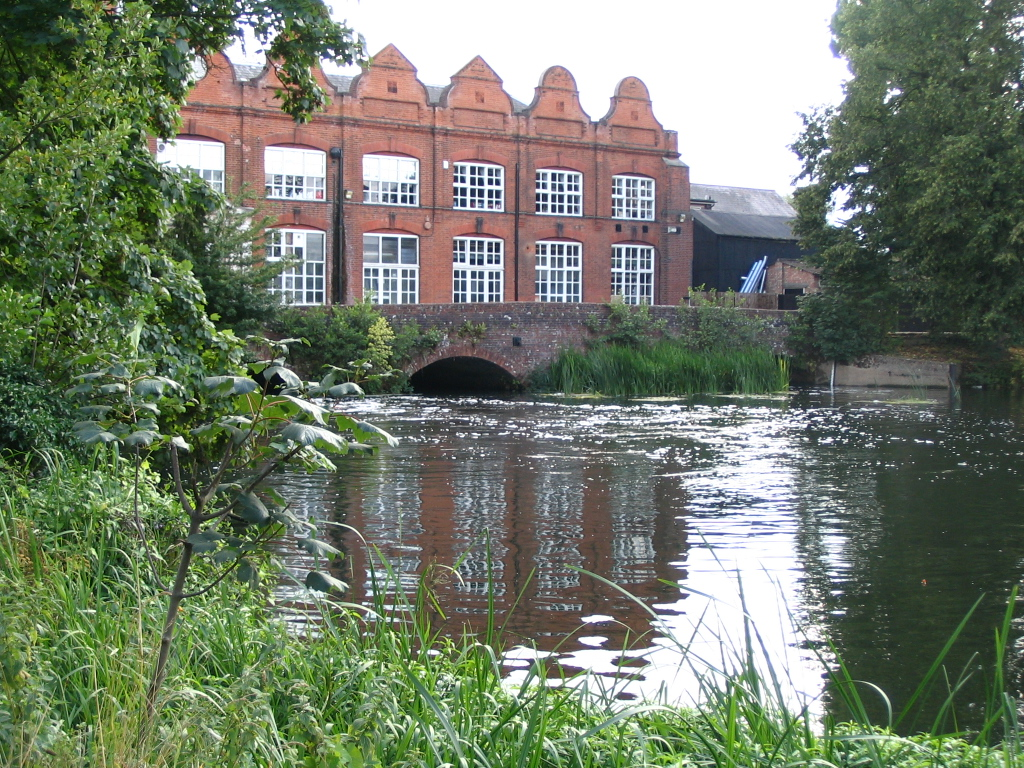
The former Unwins' Print Works, now redeveloped into the Gresham Mill apartment complex

Redevelopment has resulted in the demolition of the majority of the Victorian buildings in the town centre. Since 2012, the policy of the borough council has been to permit high-density residential development in this area, exemplified by two residential towers completed in Spring 2022 as part of the Victoria Square project. Elsewhere in the borough, the conversion of former industrial land to residential use is encouraged in preference to building on greenfield sites. Recent examples include the redevelopment of the former Unwins' Print Works at Old Woking into the Gresham Mill apartment complex.

=== Commerce and industry ===
Wokeing Inclosure Act 1803
- Act of Parliament
- Parliament of the United Kingdom
- Long title: An Act for inclosing Lands in the Manor and Tything of Sutton, next Wokeing, in the Parish of Wokeing, in the County of Surrey.
- Citation: 43 Geo. 3. c. 103 Pr.

Dates
- Royal assent: 13 July 1803

Until the mid-19th century, the local economy was dominated by agriculture, although large areas of the modern borough were covered by infertile waste land. Acts of Inclosure were passed for Byfleet (1800), Sutton (1803) and Pyrford (1905) – the Byfleet and Weybridge Inclosure Act 1800 (39 & 40 Geo. 3. c. lxxxvii), Wokeing Inclosure Act 1803 (43 Geo. 3. c. 103 Pr.) and Pyrford Inclosure Act 1805 (45 Geo. 3. c. 49 Pr.), respectively – allowing landowners to rededicate land for pasture and growing crops. (Note: The fertility of the local soils was improved with the spreading of lime, produced by burning chalk quarried from the North Downs or, after the completion of the Basingstoke Canal in 1794, transported by barge from Hampshire.) Inclosure was not completed at Woking until the London Necropolis Company purchased the common land in 1854. No act was passed for Horsell, and the large area of common land to the north of Woking remains free of development as a result.

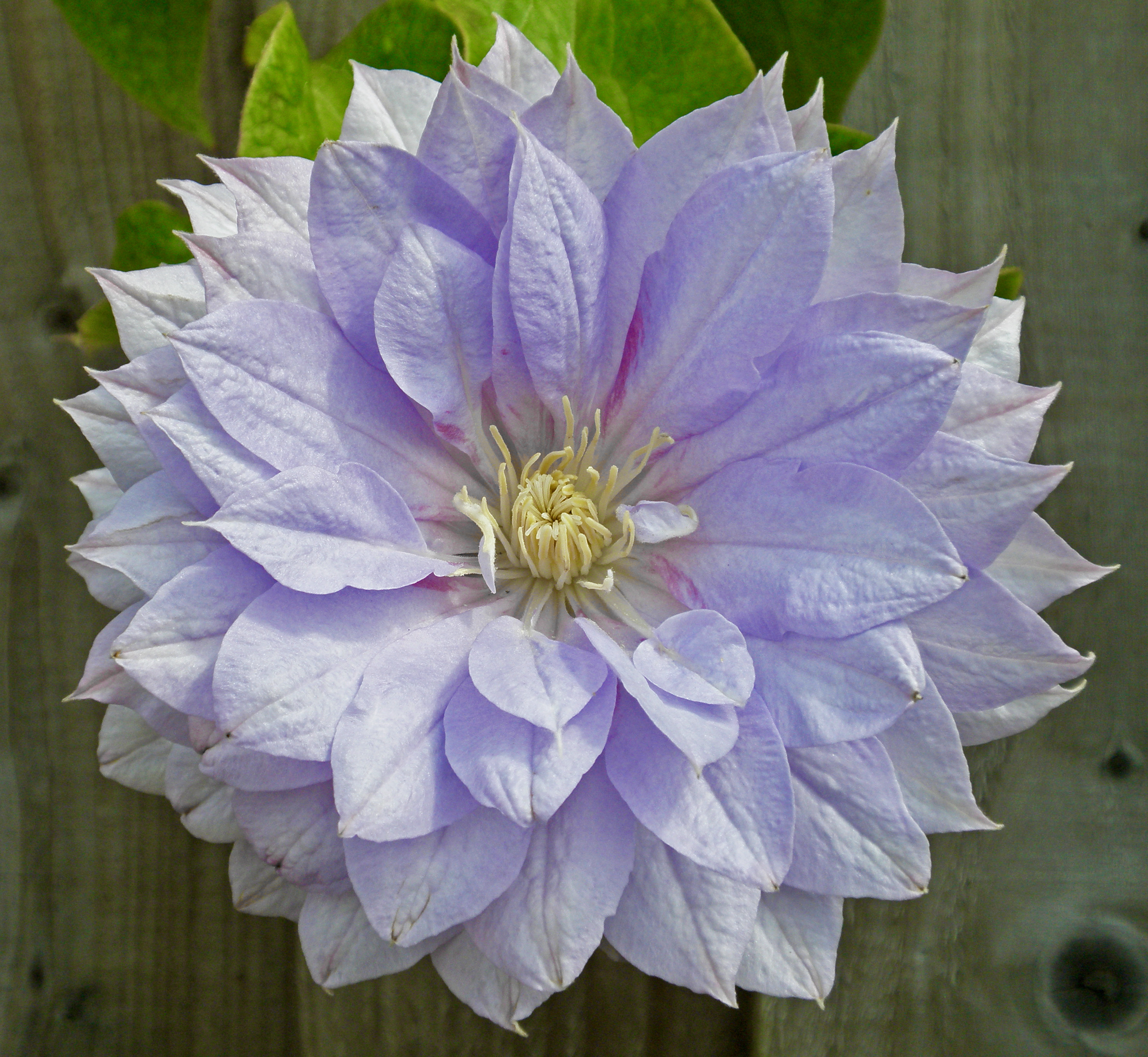
The Clematis cultivar, 'Belle of Woking'

The opening of the Basingstoke Canal in 1794 enabled new industries to be established in the west of the borough. Brickmaking had been taking place on a small scale at Knaphill since at least 1709, but the works expanded following the opening of a wharf at Kiln Bridge. Although the local soils were unsuitable for large-scale agriculture, nurseries were established on the Bracklesham Beds in the 1790s, to satisfy the increasing demand for ornamental garden plants from the growing middle class in London. (Note: The warm Bracklesham Beds were found to be particularly suitable for young plants, as the sandy soil provided protection against frost to developing roots.) The Clematis specialist, George Jackman, was among those who established nurseries at Mayford and Goldsworth Park. Cultivars first grown by his firm include the 'Jackmanii' and the 'Belle of Woking'. By 1900, horticulture was one of the most important industries in the area, but following the end of the Second World War, most firms closed or relocated, and their land was sold for housebuilding.

Heavy industry arrived in Woking during the First World War with the establishment of the Martinsyde Aircraft Works on Oriental Road. The founders, H. P. Martin and George Handasyde were unable to expand their existing factory at Brooklands and set up a new factory, known as the Lion Works, on the site of the former Oriental Institute. By 1919, over 600 Buzzard biplanes had been produced in Woking, but following the end of the war, demand for aircraft declined, and the company closed in 1924.

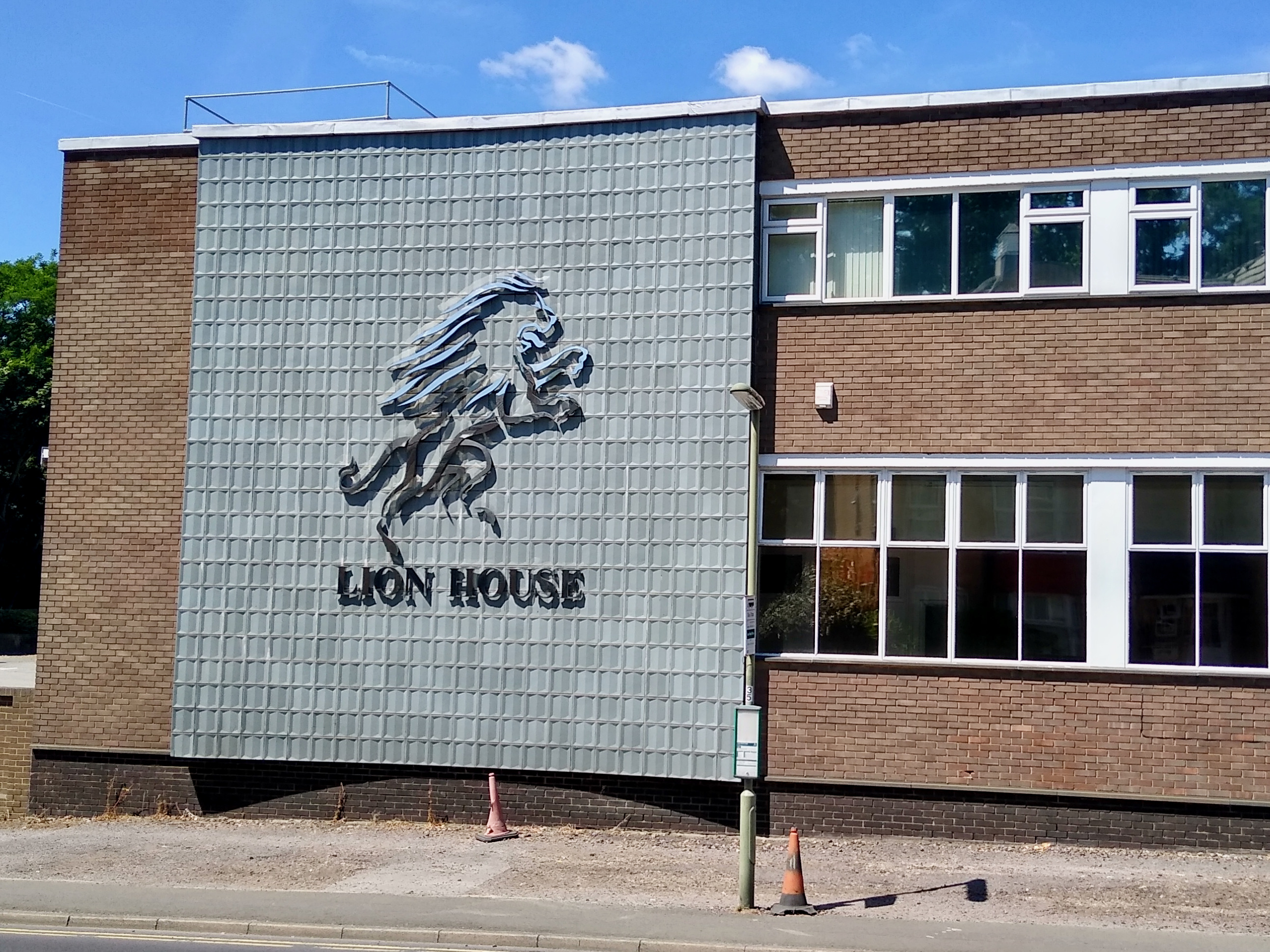
Lion House, headquarters of James Walker Ltd

In 1926, the site of the Lion Works was purchased by James Walker, whose company specialised in the production of packaging materials. By 1939, the factory was the largest employer in Woking and, in the mid-1950s, 8% of the local workforce was working for the company. Manufacturing ceased in Woking in 1993, but the company headquarters is still based in the town. The factory site was redeveloped into the Lion Retail Park.

The Sorbo Rubber Works opened in 1920 on the site of the former steam laundry on Maybury Road. It specialised in the manufacture of rubber sponges but also made toys for children. Production moved to Arnold Road in 1922, and during the Second World War, the company made self-sealing aircraft fuel tanks for the Royal Air Force. The company was acquired by its competitors, P. B. Cow Ltd, in 1948.

The first known brewery in the area was founded in Old Woking in 1715 and continued to trade until 1890. Brewery Road in Horsell is named for the business owned by the Stedman family, which operated from the 1860s until the 1910s. Byfleet Brewery, the largest in the modern borough, was active for much of the second half of the 19th century, but production was moved to Guildford after the company was taken over by Friary Ales in the 1890s. The multinational brewing and beverage company, SABMiller, was based in Woking from 1999 until it was bought by Anheuser-Busch InBev SA/NV in 2016. As part of the takeover deal, several former SABMiller brands, including Peroni and Grolsch, were purchased by the Japanese firm, Asahi Breweries. As of 2022, the UK headquarters of Asahi Breweries is in Woking.

The McLaren Group was founded in 1981 by Ron Dennis following his acquisition of the McLaren Formula One team. The McLaren Technology Centre, designed by Foster + Partners as the headquarters of the group, was formally opened by Elizabeth II in 2004. The 50 ha (120-acre) site, to the north of the town centre, includes the McLaren Production Centre, the primary manufacturing facility for McLaren Automotive. In 2013, McLaren was the largest employer in the borough.

=== Woking in the Second World War ===
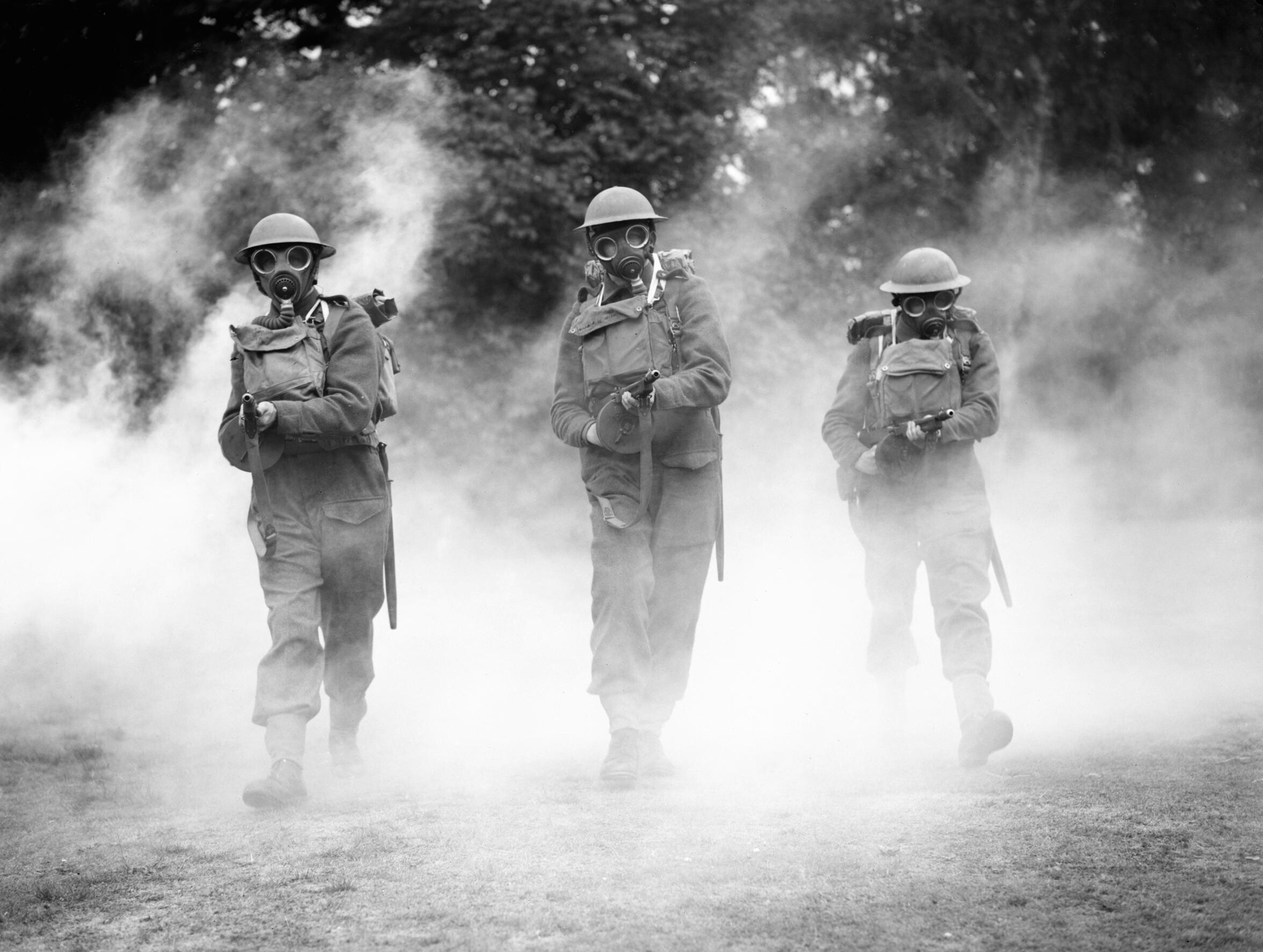
Soldiers of the Irish Guards carrying Tommy guns during a training exercise at Woking in July 1940

During the Second World War, the defence of Woking and the surrounding area was coordinated by the 11th Battalion of the South Eastern Home Guard. Training was carried out at Mizens Farm, Horsell, and included a mock battle with Canadian, Polish and Free French troops in 1941. Dedicated Home Guard units were responsible for guarding the Woking Electric Supply Company power station, the GQ parachute factory and the Sorbo Rubber Works. Woking railway station was defended by troops operating light anti-aircraft artillery.

Air raid shelters were opened on Commercial Road and at Wheatsheaf Recreation Ground in 1939, followed in 1941 by further shelters, including at Victoria Gardens. The presence of a major railway junction as well as several Vickers factories making aircraft parts, made Woking an obvious target for enemy bombing. The most severe attack took place in January 1941, in which seven people were killed. By the end of 1944, the borough had experienced 58 air raids, during which around 25 houses had been destroyed and almost 2300 damaged. The final bomb attack on Woking, a V-2 rocket, fell on 2 March 1945. Ultimately, 18 civilian deaths due to enemy action were recorded in Woking Urban District.

== National and local government ==
The town is in the parliamentary constituency of Woking and has been represented at Westminster since July 2024 by Liberal Democrat Will Forster.

Councillors are elected to Surrey County Council every four years. The borough is covered by seven divisions, each of which elects one councillor. The seven divisions are: "The Byfleets", "Goldsworth East and Horsell Village", "Knaphill and Goldsworth West", "Woking North", "Woking South", "Woking South East" and "Woking South West".

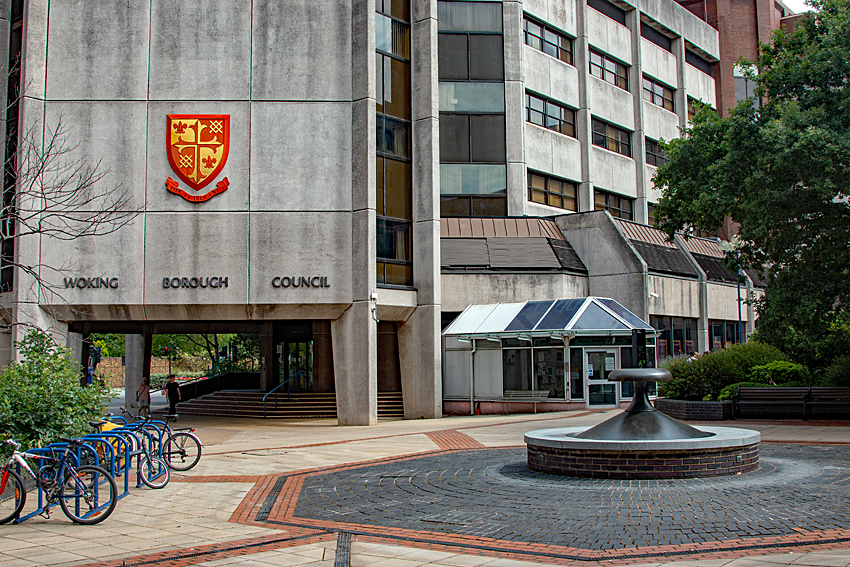
Woking Civic Offices

Elections to the borough council take place in three out of every four years. A total of 30 councillors serve at any one time, ten of whom are elected at each election. The council is led by an executive committee consisting of the Leader and six portfolio holders. Each year, one of the councillors serves as Mayor of Woking for a period of twelve months. The role of mayor is primarily ceremonial and the post has little political power. Among the people and organisations to have received the Freedom of the Borough are Howard Panter, Rosemary Squire and the Army Training Centre Pirbright.

Woking is twinned with: Amstelveen, Netherlands (since 1989); Le Plessis-Robinson, France (since 1993); Rastatt, Germany (since 2001). In December 2014, the borough council announced that it would establish a task group to explore potential twinning opportunities with towns in Brazil, Russia, India, China and South Africa.

== Demography and housing ==
In 2021, the population of the Borough of Woking was 103,900. According to the 2011 Census, 83.6% of the inhabitants were white, 11.6% were of Asian descent and 2.4% were mixed race.

There has long been a large Italian community in Woking, most of whom originated from the Sicilian town of Mussomeli. The majority of the original arrivals worked in the Britax factory in Byfleet and others on the mushroom farms in Chobham or for the James Walker company. Many started their own landscaping or ice cream businesses. St Dunstan's Catholic Church in Woking holds masses in Italian. The Italian population in Woking, including second- and third-generation members, numbers between two and three thousand.

There is a large Pakistani population in Woking, centred on Maybury and Sheerwater.

2011 Census households
| Area | Population | Households | Owned outright | Owned with a loan | Social rented | Private rented |
|---|---|---|---|---|---|---|
| Borough of Woking | 79,185 | 40,964 | 31.6% | 38.9% | 11.9% | 15.7% |
| South East Region | 8,634,750 | 3,555,463 | 35.1% | 32.5% | 13.7% | 16.3% |

2011 Census homes
| Ward | Detached | Semi-detached | Terraced | Flats and apartments |
|---|---|---|---|---|
| Borough of Woking | 32.1% | 24.3% | 19.5% | 24.8% |
| South East Region | 28.0% | 27.6% | 22.4% | 21.2% |

== Economy ==
In the early 21st century, Woking has a strong economy relative to the rest of the UK; the borough was awarded first place in the UK Vitality Index of Local Authorities, compiled by Lambert Smith Hampton in 2021, and was placed in the top 20% of all Local Authorities for economic vibrancy by Grant Thornton in 2016. University graduates comprise more than 60% of the workforce, although around 53% of all working residents commute out of the borough on a daily basis. According to the 2015–2016 Annual Population Survey, 85% of the working-age population are in employment (compared to the Surrey average of 80%) and 14% are self-employed (compared to the county average of 12%). However, economic prosperity is not spread uniformly across the borough; two areas of Sheerwater are the most deprived parts of Surrey.

In the mid-2010s, the industries providing the largest number of jobs in the borough were information technology, food and beverage services, and motor vehicle design and manufacture. Woking also has a significant cluster of companies operating in the oil and gas industries, financial and business services industry, as well as the environmental technologies sector.

In May 2023, a government review revealed that the council would have debts of £2.4bn by 2026, 100 times the size of its annual £24m budget, including investments in hotels and residential skyscrapers and a £6.4m loan to a local private school. On the same day, the Minister for Local Government Lee Rowley announced that the council was to be overseen by a team of expert commissioners until the council could "address their commercial and financial challenges, and make transformative change across its entire operations."

On 7 June 2023 Woking council declared bankruptcy with £1.2bn deficit due to risky investments involving hotels and skyscrapers overseen by its former Conservative administration.

== Public services ==
=== Utilities ===
Woking Gas and Water Company began supplying the growing town with drinking water in 1883. The supply was pumped from a 40 m-deep (130 ft) borehole at West Horsley, allowing the villages to the south of the town to be fed from the same supply. Horsell and Pyrford were connected to the Woking mains by 1895, and in 1900, the South West Suburban Water Company started to supply Byfleet. The water companies serving the borough merged with their neighbours in 1973 to form the North Surrey Water Company, which became part of Veolia Water UK in October 2000. Following further changes of name in 2009 and 2012, Veolia Water UK is now known as Affinity Water.

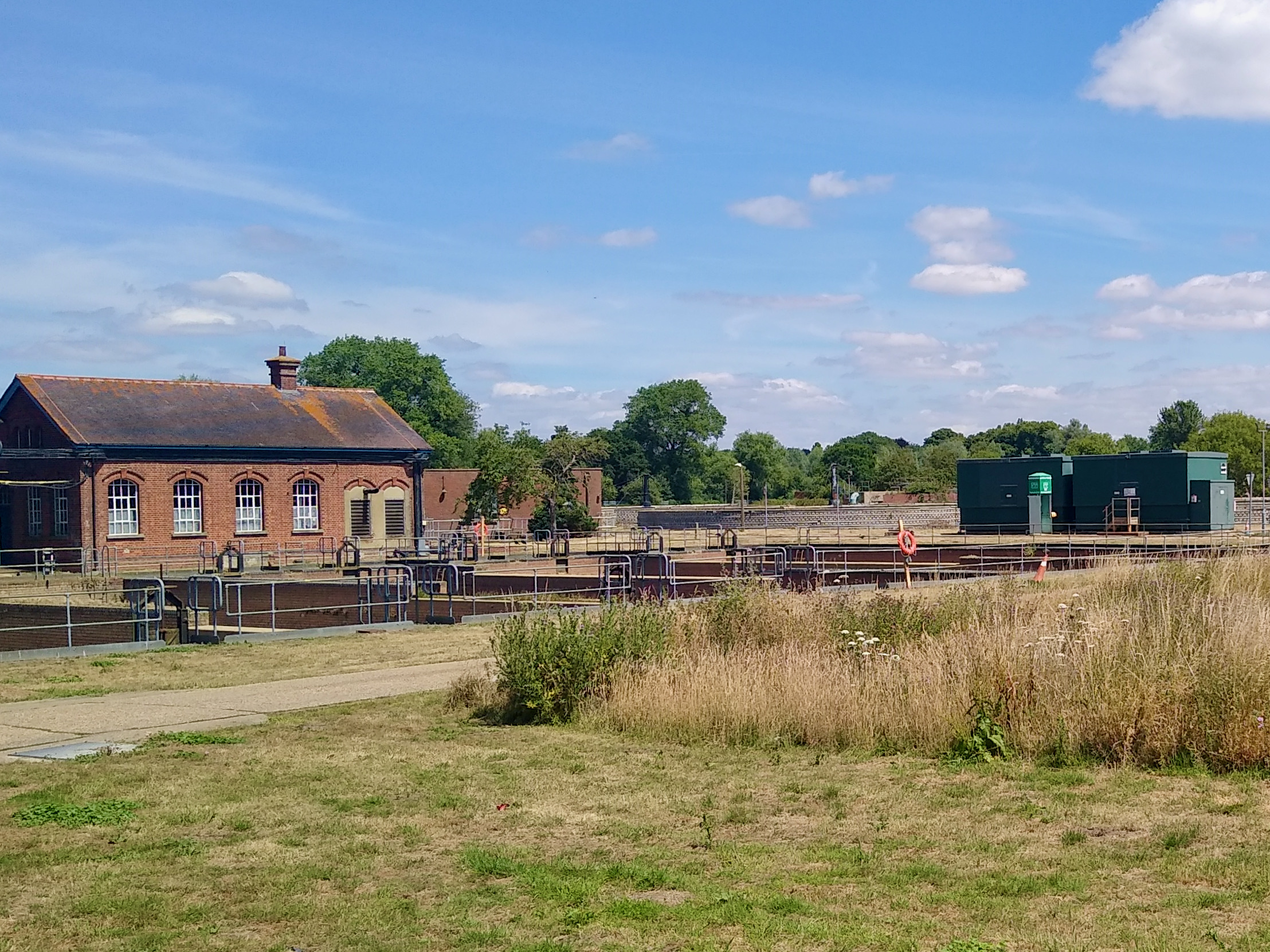
Woking Sewage Treatment Works

As Woking grew in the second half of the 19th century, much of its wastewater was stored in cesspools, emptied into ditches, or discharged into the street. The sewage works at Woking Park Farm, Carters Lane were opened in December 1896. Sewers had been laid to the majority of the town centre by 1899 and to Horsell by 1907. A separate sewage works was created at Wisley to serve Byfleet, West Byfleet and parts of Pyrford.

The public gasworks opened in Boundary Road in 1892 and, until 1936, the coal required was supplied via the Basingstoke Canal. Gas mains were laid to Horsell in 1897 and to West Byfleet in 1899. From 1929, additional gas was supplied from Leatherhead via a connection at Effingham Junction. By December 1935, the Woking District Gas Company had laid around 120 mi (190 km) of gas mains and was supplying over 9000 customers in a 52 sq mi (130 km^{2}) area. The Wandsworth and District Gas Company acquired a controlling stake in the Woking company in 1936.

Woking Electric Supply Company was founded in 1889 and opened its power station in Board School Road the same year. Initially the generator only ran in the hours of darkness and there were only 180 connected properties by 1895. Electric streetlights were installed in Woking in 1893, but in 1902, they were replaced by gas lamps. Electric street lighting was reinstalled in the town in 1931. Under the Electricity (Supply) Act 1926, Woking was connected to the National Grid, initially to a 33 kV supply ring, which linked the town to Guildford, Godalming, Hindhead and Aldershot. In 1932, a 132 kW substation was installed at West Byfleet, which connected the Woking ring to Luton and Wimbledon. The Board School Road power station closed in 1959, by which time it had an installed capacity of 7000 kW.

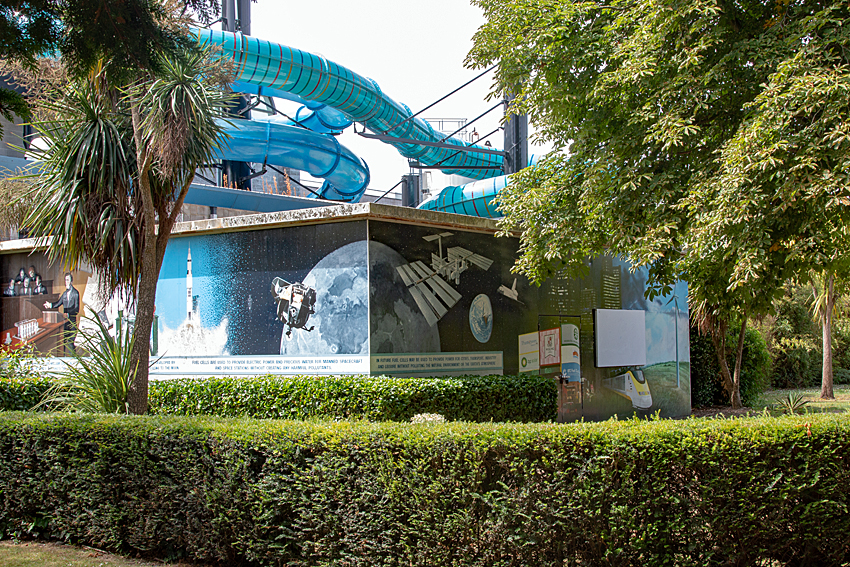
Fuel cell in Woking Park

Since the mid-1990s, the borough council has commissioned a series of renewable energy installations to generate heat and electricity to power local homes and offices. Operated by the council-owned subsidiary, ThamesWey, the scheme includes combined heat and power plants, photovoltaic arrays and a 200 kW hydrogen fuel cell at Woking Park. The council aims to generate 15% of the electricity used in the borough from photovoltaics by 2032 and to increase the installed capacity of renewable energy generators to 11 MW by 2030. (Note: Since 20 January 2022, all taxis and private hire vehicles operating in the Borough of Woking have been required to meet the Euro 6 emissions standards.)

=== Emergency services and justice ===
The first fire brigade in the borough was formed in Byfleet in the mid-1880s. In October 1895, the brigade in Woking was formed and was initially equipped with a hand cart, ladders and leather hoses. The first Woking fire engine, a horse-drawn waggon with a steam-powered pump, was purchased by the UDC in 1899. It was replaced in 1919 with a diesel fire engine with telescopic ladders. A second engine was added in 1925. In September 1939, the Woking and Byfleet brigades were merged with others serving nearby towns into a single, combined force covering the whole of Surrey.

In 2022, the fire authority for Woking is Surrey County Council and the statutory fire service is Surrey Fire and Rescue Service. Ambulance services are run by the South East Coast Ambulance Service.

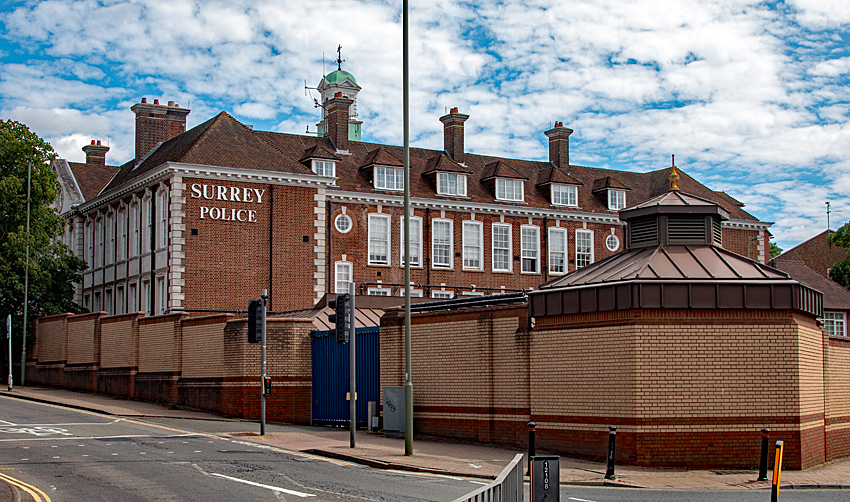
Woking police station

At end of the 19th century, a police sergeant and two constables were working in Woking and there was a second sergeant at Knaphill. By 1908, the local force had grown to 31, including a superintendent. In 2022, Surrey Police is responsible for policing in the borough. Since January 2020, the force has operated a front counter at Woking Civic Offices in the town centre. The current police station, opened in 1990 in the former boys' grammar school in Station Approach, is due to close in around 2029.

=== Healthcare ===
Brookwood Hospital was founded in 1867 as the psychiatric hospital for west Surrey on land purchased from the London Necropolis Company. By 1875, there were 675 patients undergoing treatment, but numbers had grown to 1,477 by 1931. During the Second World War, it served as an emergency war hospital and became part of the NHS in 1948. Brookwood Hospital closed in 1994, the majority of the buildings were demolished, and the site was used for commercial and residential development.

The first general hospital in Woking was a voluntary hospital opened in Bath Road in 1893. It was followed by the 13-bed Victoria Cottage Hospital on the corner of Boundary Lane and Chobham Road. The hospital was extended several times, and by the start of the Second World War, its capacity had increased to 100 in-patient beds. In 1933, Woking UDC and neighbouring councils began to develop plans to concentrate health services at what would become St Peter's Hospital, Chertsey. Nevertheless, the Victoria Hospital continued to provide non-emergency medical services in the town until its closure in 1993.

Woking Community Hospital, on Heathside Road, offers a walk-in centre for patients with minor injuries and an in-patient rehabilitation ward. The Bradley Unit is a specialist facility for those recovering from brain injuries. The Bedser Hub, opened in March 2016, was funded by a legacy from Sir Alec Bedser and provides support to enable older people to remain independent and active. In 2022, the nearest hospitals with an A&E department are St Peter's Hospital, Chertsey, Royal Surrey County Hospital and Frimley Park Hospital.

== Transport ==
The borough has good transport links to London and the wider south east region: It is linked to the national motorway network via junction 11 of the M25 and junction 3 of the M3. However, Woking is poorly connected by road to local towns in north-west Surrey and there are only two north–south routes for road vehicles across the South West Main Line in the town centre, both of which suffer from congestion at peak times. Addressing the capacity of the local road network was identified as a priority in the 2018 Woking Forward Programme, published by the county council.

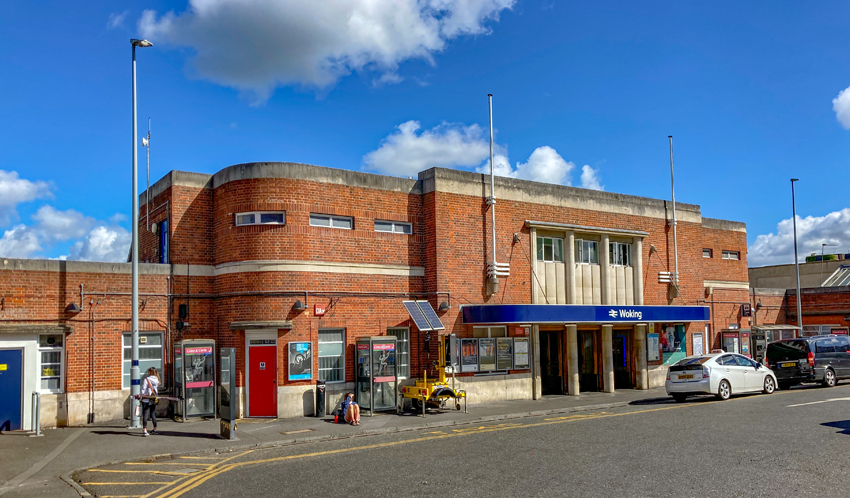
Woking railway station's art deco style entrance

Woking railway station is to the south of the town centre. It is managed by South Western Railway, which operates all services. Trains run to London Waterloo via Clapham Junction, to Southampton Central and Salisbury via Basingstoke, to Alton via Farnham and to Portsmouth Harbour via Guildford or Eastleigh. South Western Railway also runs all train services from Brookwood, Worplesdon and West Byfleet stations.

Woking town centre is linked by a number of bus routes to surrounding towns and villages in north and west Surrey. Operators serving the town include Carlone Buses, Falcon Bus, Stagecoach and White Bus. A RailAir coach service links Woking station to Heathrow Airport.

The River Wey is navigable from Weybridge to Godalming and the navigation authority is the National Trust. The Basingstoke Canal is open for navigation from the Wey at Byfleet to Greywell Tunnel when the water supply permits. The navigation authority is the Basingstoke Canal Authority. The majority of the locks have set opening times, and passage must be pre-booked.

National Cycle Network Route 221 connects Pirbright to New Haw and runs alongside the Basingstoke Canal. Route 223, which connects Chertsey to Shoreham-by-Sea, passes through Woking, as does the "Woking and Egham link" of the Surrey Cycleway. In 2009, the borough council received funding to develop a 26 km (16 mi) off-road cycle network, resulting in the creation of 21 routes, collectively known as the "Planet Trails". The trails celebrate the area's connections to The War of the Worlds by H. G. Wells and each route is named after either a planet or a moon in the Solar System. A 9.8 km diameter (6.1 mi) crater on the planet Mars was named after the town in 2006.

The Fox Way, a 39 mi (63 km) footpath that circles Guildford, passes through the south of the borough at Sutton Green and Worplesdon railway station. The E2 European long distance path runs along the towpath of the River Wey Navigation from Sutton to Byfleet.

== Education ==
=== Early schools ===
The oldest surviving record of a school in the modern borough is from 1725 when there appears to have been a small school at Byfleet. In the same year, the vicar of Woking reported that there was "one poore writing master" living in his parish and that younger children attended dame schools to learn to read. There is a record of a Church of England-affiliated school in Horsell in 1788 and, in the 1790s, a school for non-conformists opened nearby. National schools were established at Pyrford in 1847 and at Old Woking in 1848.

=== Current schools and colleges ===
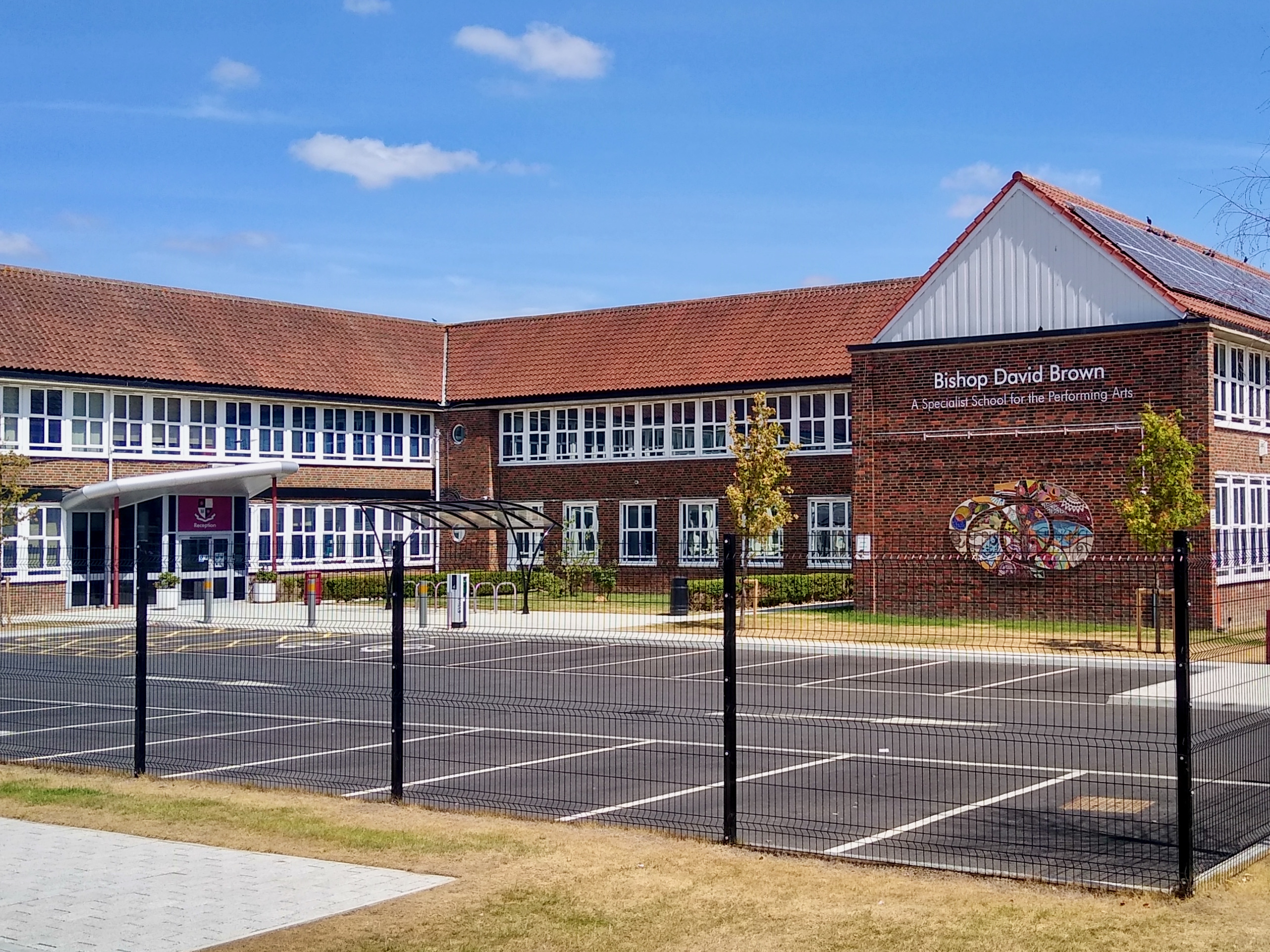
Bishop David Brown School, Sheerwater

The Winston Churchill School is a mixed comprehensive school for pupils aged 11 to 16. It opened in January 1967 on part of the former Inkerman Barracks site and its buildings were designed by the County Architect, Raymond Ash. The school planetarium was opened in 2019 by former pupil and Doctor Who actor, Peter Davison. Outside of school hours, the planetarium is open to the public and regularly hosts films and lectures on astronomy.

The St John the Baptist School is a mixed Catholic school for pupils aged 11 to 18. It has been sponsored by the Xavier Catholic Education Trust since September 2016, when it gained academy status. The school, on Elmbridge Lane, was founded in 1969.

Woking High School was founded in 1970 as Horsell Secondary School, replacing the former Chobham and Goldsworth Schools. It gained academy status in August 2013 and educates pupils aged 11 to 16.

The Bishop David Brown School, in Sheerwater, is a mixed academy for pupils aged 11 to 16. It was formed in 1982 through the merger of the Sheerwater Secondary and Queen Elizabeth II Schools. It was named in honour of David Brown, Bishop of Guildford who died in July of that year. Since 2015, it has been operated by the Unity Schools Trust.

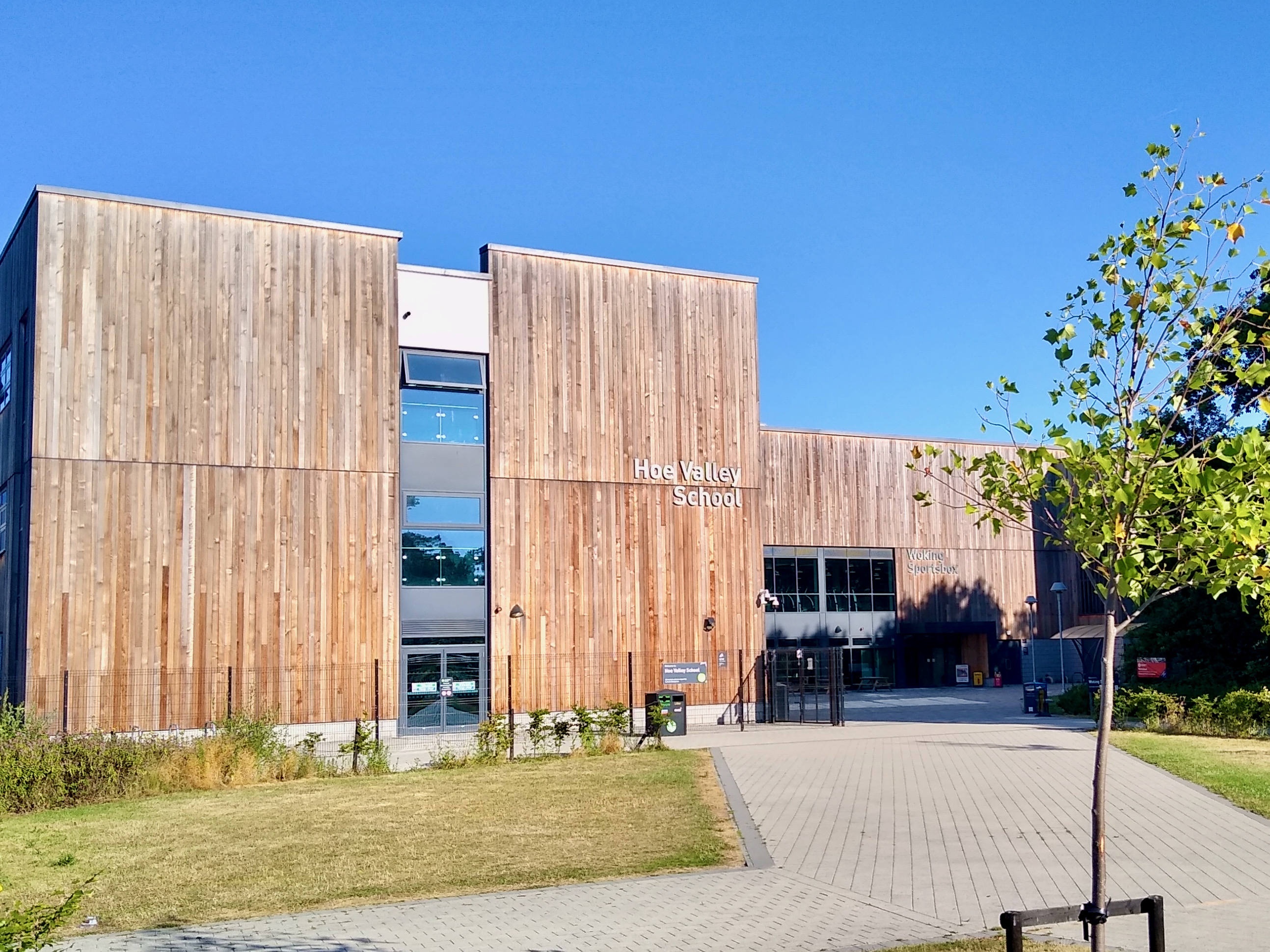
Hoe Valley School

Hoe Valley School opened in September 2015 at Woking Park and moved to its current site on Egley Road three years later. The free school currently educates children up to the age of 16, and the sixth form is due to open in 2023.

Woking College, in Rydens Way, opened in September 1977 with an initial intake of 730 students. It educates pupils aged 16–19 and gained academy status in September 2017. In November 2021, the sixth form college was awarded £3M funding to construct a new teaching block. The facility will enable student numbers to rise by 200 from the current enrollment of 1,450.

The Gordon Ramsay Academy opened in Commercial Way in September 2021. The site was previously the Tante Marie Culinary Academy, founded in 1954.

== Places of worship ==
=== Anglican ===
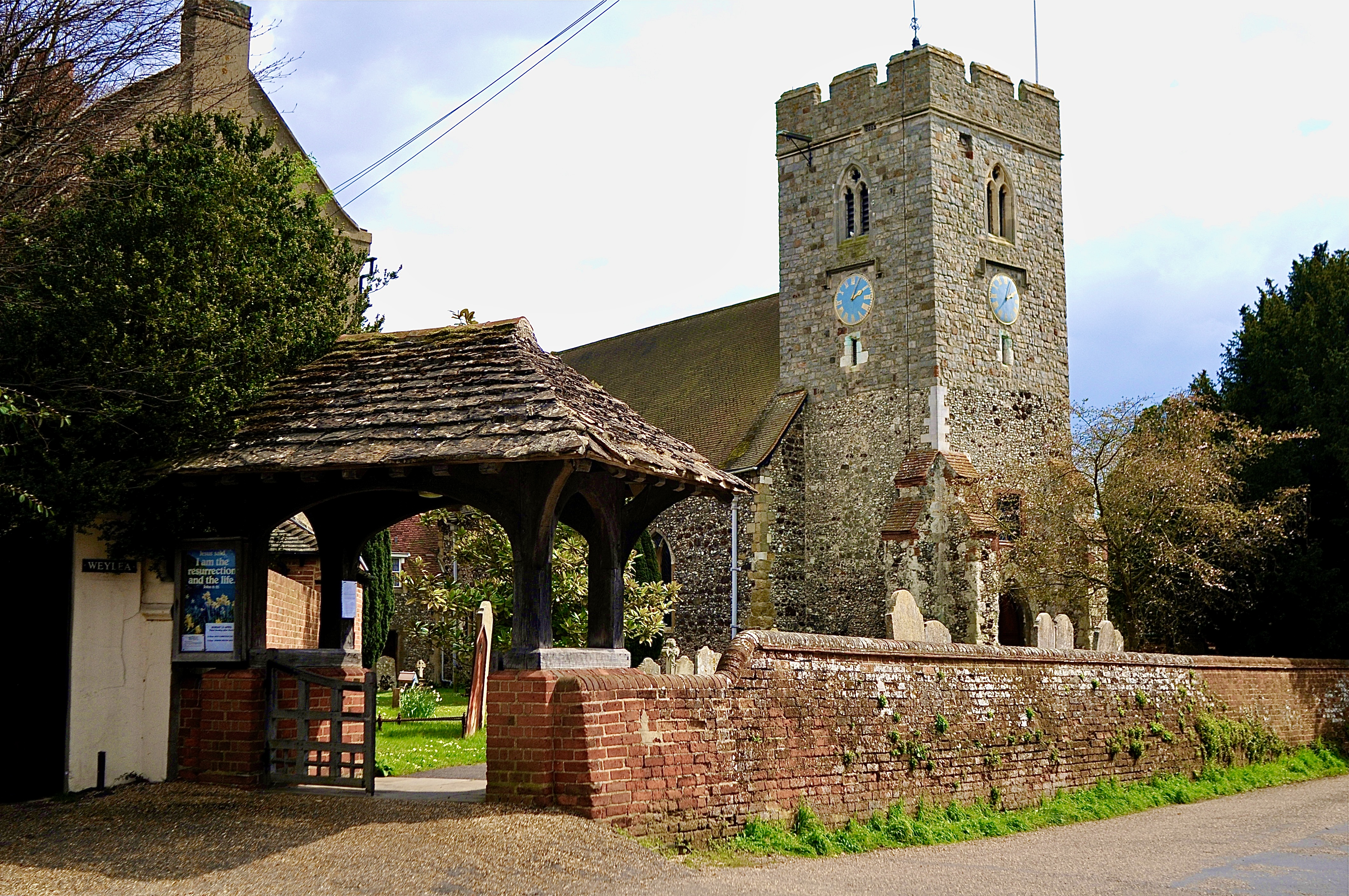
St Peter's Church, Old Woking

The Church of England churches in the borough belong to the Woking Deanery, part of the Diocese of Guildford. Eight of the churches are listed, including three that are Grade I listed.

St Peter's Church, Old Woking is the oldest surviving building in the borough. There is thought to have been a wooden church on the site during the Saxon period, but it was replaced with a stone building in the decades following the Norman Conquest. The lower part of the walls of the nave date from the reign of William I and the oak west door is from c. 1100. The oldest parts of the Church of St Mary the Virgin, in Byfleet, date from the 13th century, but the building was extended in the mid-19th century. Also Grade I-listed is the 12th-century St Nicholas' Church in Pyrford, the interior of which has remnants of medieval wall paintings.

The Grade II*-listed Church of St Mary the Virgin at Horsell was built as a stone chapel in the mid-12th century. It was rebuilt in the 14th century, and the tower was constructed in the 15th century in flint, clunch and heathstone. The church is noted for its oak pulpit, which dates from 1602. The Grade II-listed churches in the borough are Christ Church, in Woking town centre, the Church of All Saints, in Woodham Lane, the Church of St Mary of Bethany, on Mount Hermon Road, and the Church of St John the Baptist, in Parvis Road.

=== Other Christian denominations ===
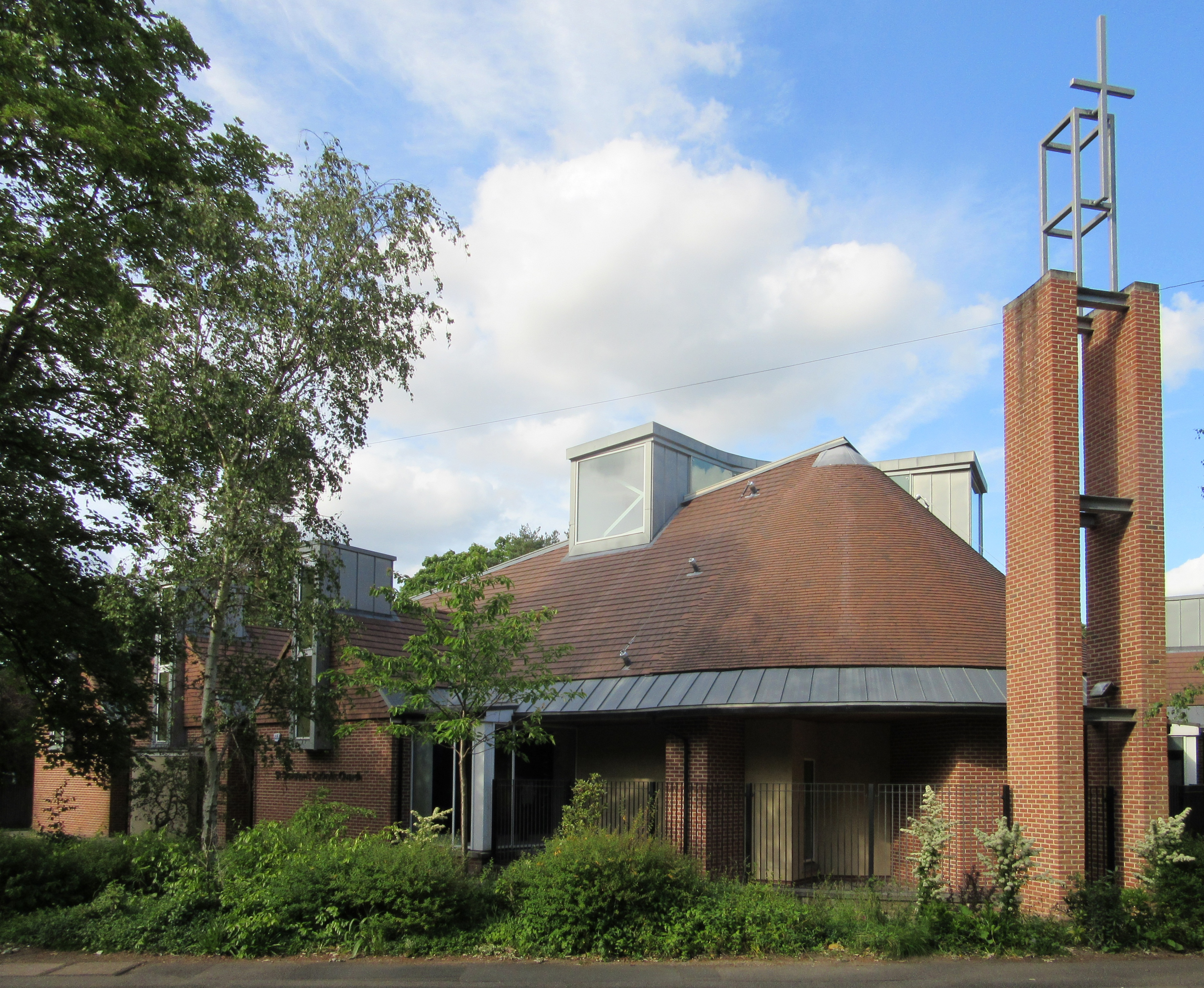
St Dunstan's Church

The first Catholic church in the borough was built at Sutton Park in 1875–6. The Church of St Edward the Confessor was designed in the early-English Gothic style by James Harris. The south porch includes a seated statue of Edward the Confessor above the door. The present St Dunstan's Church, on Shaftesbury Road, was opened in 2008. It replaced an earlier church of the same name that had been opened in 1925 on White Rose Lane.

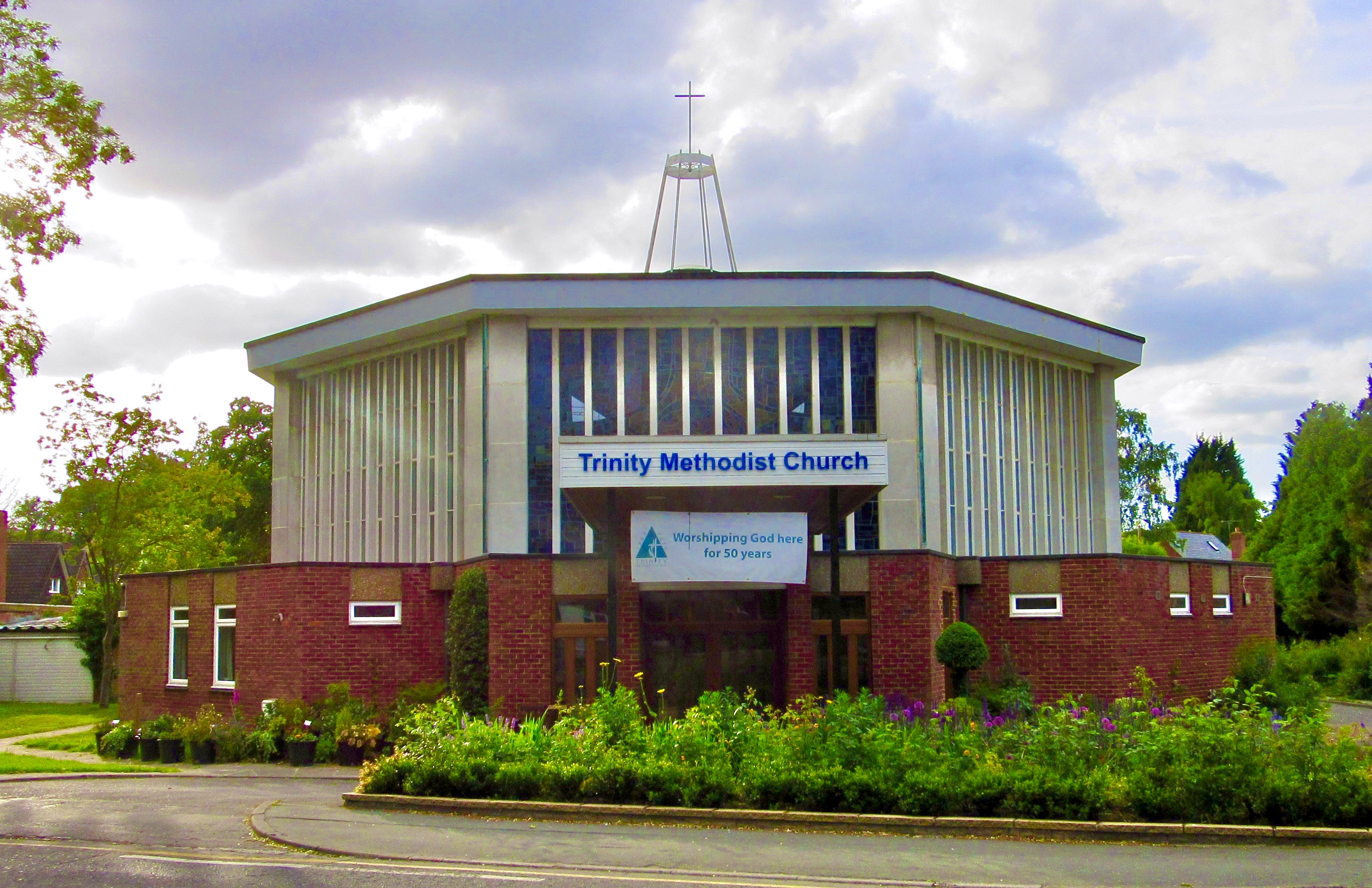
Trinity Methodist Church

The first Methodist chapel in the borough was opened in College Road in 1863 and there were open-air services taking place close to the railway station in 1871. A church was built in the town centre in 1872 and, five years later, the Woking Circuit was established. A larger church was erected in 1884, which in turn was replaced in 1905. As part of the redevelopment of the town centre, the old premises were sold and a new Methodist Church, known as Trinity Methodist Church, was opened in June 1965. The design of the building was inspired by the Anglican Cathedral in Mbale, Uganda.

The two Baptist churches in the borough are part of the North Downs Network of the South Eastern Baptist Association. Knaphill Baptist Church was constructed in 1882 and was originally called “Hope Chapel”. The New Life Baptist Church began as an offshoot of the former Percy Street Baptist Church in Old Woking in 1929, but became independent in 1956.

The Quaker Meeting House in Park Road is a detached early 1900s house, converted in the 1960s for their use. The Meeting is part of the Surrey and Hampshire Borders Area Meeting.

=== Other religions ===
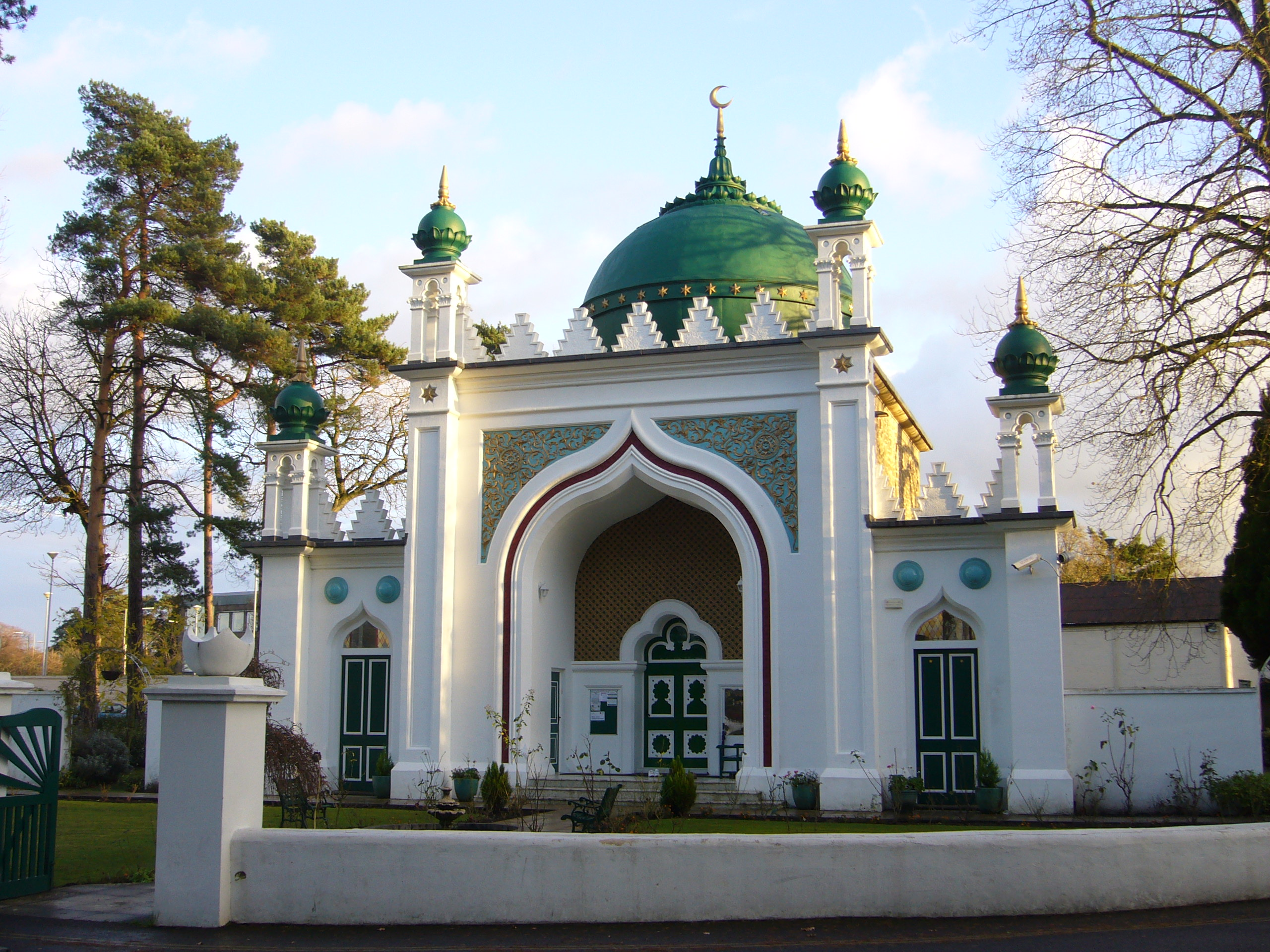
Shah Jahan Mosque, northern façade

The Shah Jahan Mosque, the first purpose-built mosque in the country, was constructed in 1889 by Gottlieb Wilhelm Leitner on the grounds of the Oriental Institute. It was funded, in part, by Sultan Shah Jahan, Begum of Bhopal and was designed by William Isaac Chambers in the late-Mughal style. The central prayer hall is roofed by an onion dome, topped by a crescent finial, and the northern façade has four open turrets, linked by triangular crow-stepped battlements. The mosque closed following Leitner's death in 1899, but reopened in 1912 following a restoration project by Khwaja Kamal-ud-Din.

The Woking Buddhist Temple at Knaphill is one of 15 Thai Buddhist temples in England and is the headquarters of the Dhammakaya Movement in England. It occupies the former chapel of Brookwood Hospital, which closed in 1994. The Meditation Garden opened in the temple grounds in October 2021.

== Culture ==
=== Literature ===
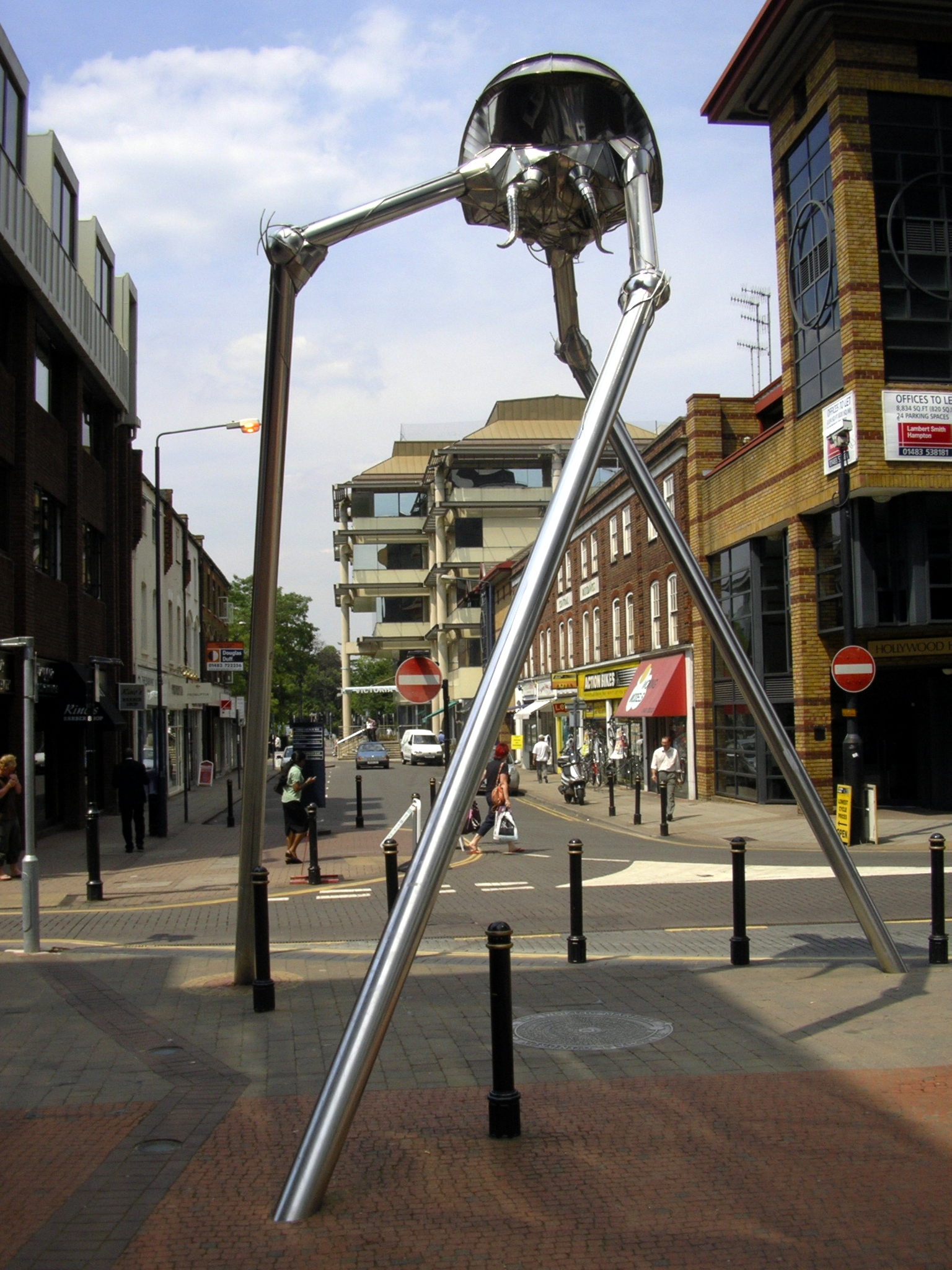
The Woking Martian Tripod sculpture

Much of The War of the Worlds by H. G. Wells is set in the Woking area. The author wrote the majority of the novel between 1895 and 1898, when he lived in Maybury Road. During the early part of the story, a Martian cylinder lands on Horsell Common. A bronze statue of Wells, by the artist Wesley Harland, was unveiled in Woking town centre in September 2016. A 7 m-high (23 ft) sculpture of a Wellesian Martian Tripod by Michael Condron, was installed at one end of Crown Square in April 1998.

Briarbrae, the Woking home of a Foreign Office employee, Mr Percy Phelps, is a key setting in Sir Arthur Conan Doyle's 1892 Sherlock Holmes short story "The Adventure of the Naval Treaty". Douglas Adams defined 'Woking' in The Deeper Meaning of Liff as: "Standing in the kitchen wondering what you came in here for".

=== Media ===
The Woking News and Mail was first published in 1894 as The Woking News and was later merged with its rival, The Woking Mail, to create the combined title. In March 2011, it was closed by its owners, Guardian Media Group, but two months later, it was restarted as a monthly newspaper by local businessman, Philip Davies. Weekly editions resumed in November 2012 and in May 2017 the Woking News and Mail had a print circulation of 2,500. Tindle Newspapers Ltd acquired the paper in October 2022.

=== Music ===
The members of The Jam met as students at Sheerwater County Secondary School in the early 1970s. They began to perform in working men's clubs in Woking, before releasing their first single in 1977. Their 1982 UK Number 1 single "Town Called Malice" describes the experiences of the band growing up in Woking. Lead singer, Paul Weller named his 1995 album Stanley Road after the street where he grew up.

Rick Parfitt was a singer-songwriter and the rhythm guitarist for Status Quo, co-writing many of their record-breaking number of UK chart singles. He was born in Woking and grew up on the Elmsbridge estate, near Woking FC's stadium. Like the aforementioned members of The Jam, Parfitt started his career playing the same working men's clubs but as a solo singer. After his death in 2016, he was memorialised with a blue plaque in Woking town centre. Parfitt's son said that he and his dad "always came back" to Woking and that his dad loved the town. Parfitt's father was close friends with Weller's father and their two sons were also friends.

Other musicians include Les Reed, who wrote the songs "It's Not Unusual" and "Delilah" for Tom Jones. The pop group, the Spice Girls, began their musical careers in 1994, with dance rehearsals at the Trinity Studios in Knaphill. The venue is now known as the Woking Youth Arts Centre.

=== Public art ===
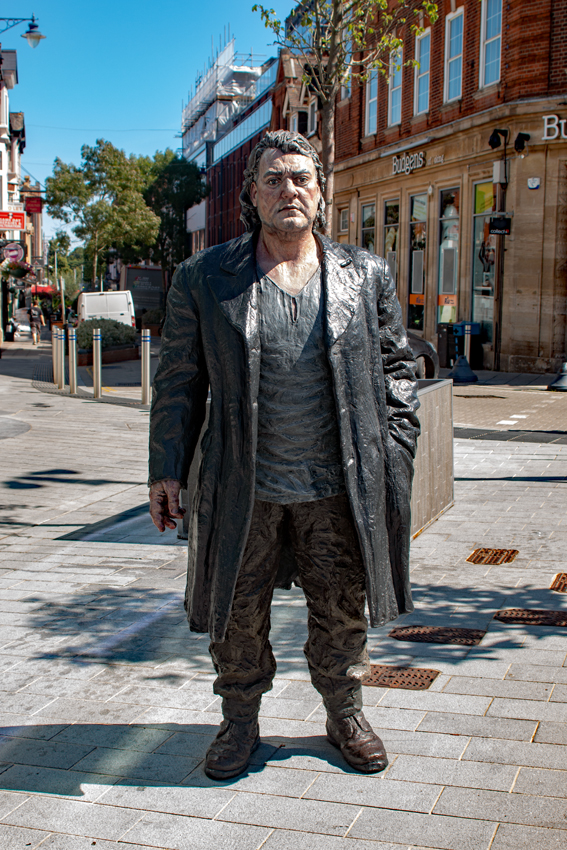
The Wanderer, by Sean Henry, in Albion Square

Among the works of public art in the town are a series of polychrome statues by Woking-born sculptor Sean Henry. Initially, the sculptures were intended to be displayed on a short-term basis as part of an art trail, but in November 2017, the borough council announced it had agreed to buy the statues and display them in the town on a permanent basis. At either end of the Bedser Bridge over the Basingstoke Canal, there are statues of cricketing brothers, Sir Alec and Eric Bedser by Allan Sly. Sir Alec is shown bowling on the south bank and Eric batting on the north bank. The Winning Shot, by Christine Charlesworth, depicts the wheelchair basketball player, Ade Adepitan, and celebrates the London 2012 Paralympic Games.

=== Venues ===
Until the early 1970s, Christ Church Hall was the only performing arts venue in Woking. It was demolished and replaced with the first purpose-built theatre, the Rhoda McGaw Theatre, which opened in 1975. It, too, was demolished and replaced by the Ambassadors Theatre Complex, which opened in 1992. The complex houses three theatres, the 1,300-seat New Victoria Theatre, a 230-seat studio theatre, also named the Rhoda McGaw Theatre and the 84 seat Buzz theatre.

The Ambassadors' Cinema, also accessed via the top floor of The Peacocks, opened with three screens in April 1993 and a further three were added in February 1997. It closed for refurbishment in 2019 and re-opened as Nova Cinema in May 2021. The new venue has seven screens, including a luxury screen.

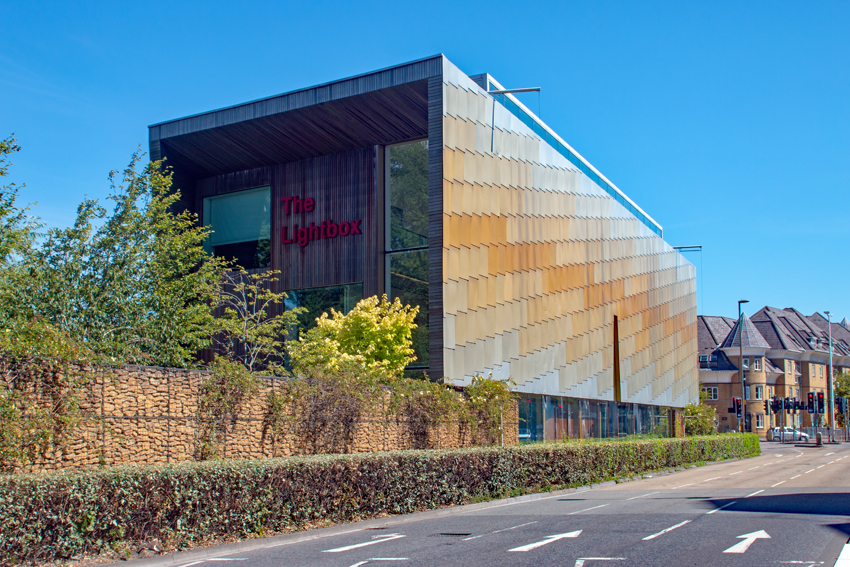
The Lightbox

The Lightbox, adjacent to the Basingstoke Canal in the centre of Woking, was opened to the public in 2007. The arts and heritage centre was designed by the architects' firm, Marks Barfield, and includes a permanent museum of local history. It hosts temporary exhibitions of works by local and international artists and the first Woking Literary Festival took place at the venue in 2017.

== Sport ==
=== Leisure centres and swimming pools ===
Eastwood Leisure Centre

Woking Leisure Centre opened on Kingfield Way in 1976 and offers a gym and facilities for badminton, basketball and five-a-side football. The centre underwent a £2M refurbishment, which was completed in June 2013. Elsewhere in the borough, the Woking Sportsbox, adjacent to Hoe Valley School, opened in July 2018 and the Eastwood Leisure Centre, in Sheerwater, opened in October 2021.

Before the first open-air pool was opened in Woking Park in 1910, local people swam in the canal and the River Wey. The first pool was replaced in 1935 by the Woking Lido, which was in turn replaced by Pool in the Park in 1989. The first water slides were opened at Pool in the Park in 1992 and were replaced by new flumes, named "The Martian" and "The Time Traveller" in July 2019. (Note: Two swimming clubs are based at Pool in the Park: Woking Swimming Club (founded in 1935) and Woking Dolphins Swimming Club for disabled swimmers (founded 1973), whose former members include the Paralympian, Denise Smith.) The Eastwood Leisure Centre offers a 25 m, 6-lane main pool and a teaching pool for children.

=== Association football ===
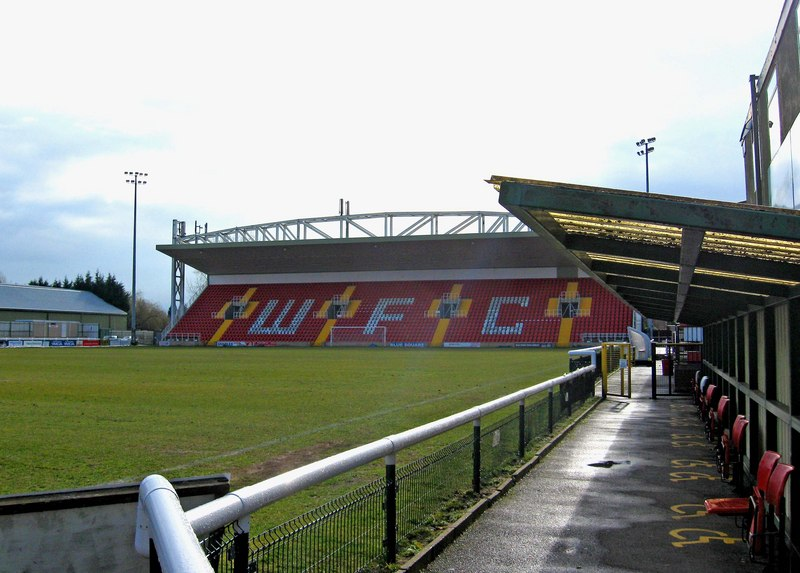
Kingfield Stadium, the home ground of Woking F.C.

Woking F.C., nicknamed "the Cardinals" or "the Cards", was formed in 1887. Initially home games were played at Wheatsheaf Common, but had moved to Kingfield by 1923. The club won the FA Amateur Cup in 1958 and the FA Trophy in 1994, 1995 and 1997. As of the 2024/25 season the team competes in the National League,

The borough also supports three clubs playing Non-League football: Westfield F.C. (founded 1953), Sheerwater F.C. (founded 1958) and Knaphill F.C. (founded 1924).

=== Cricket ===
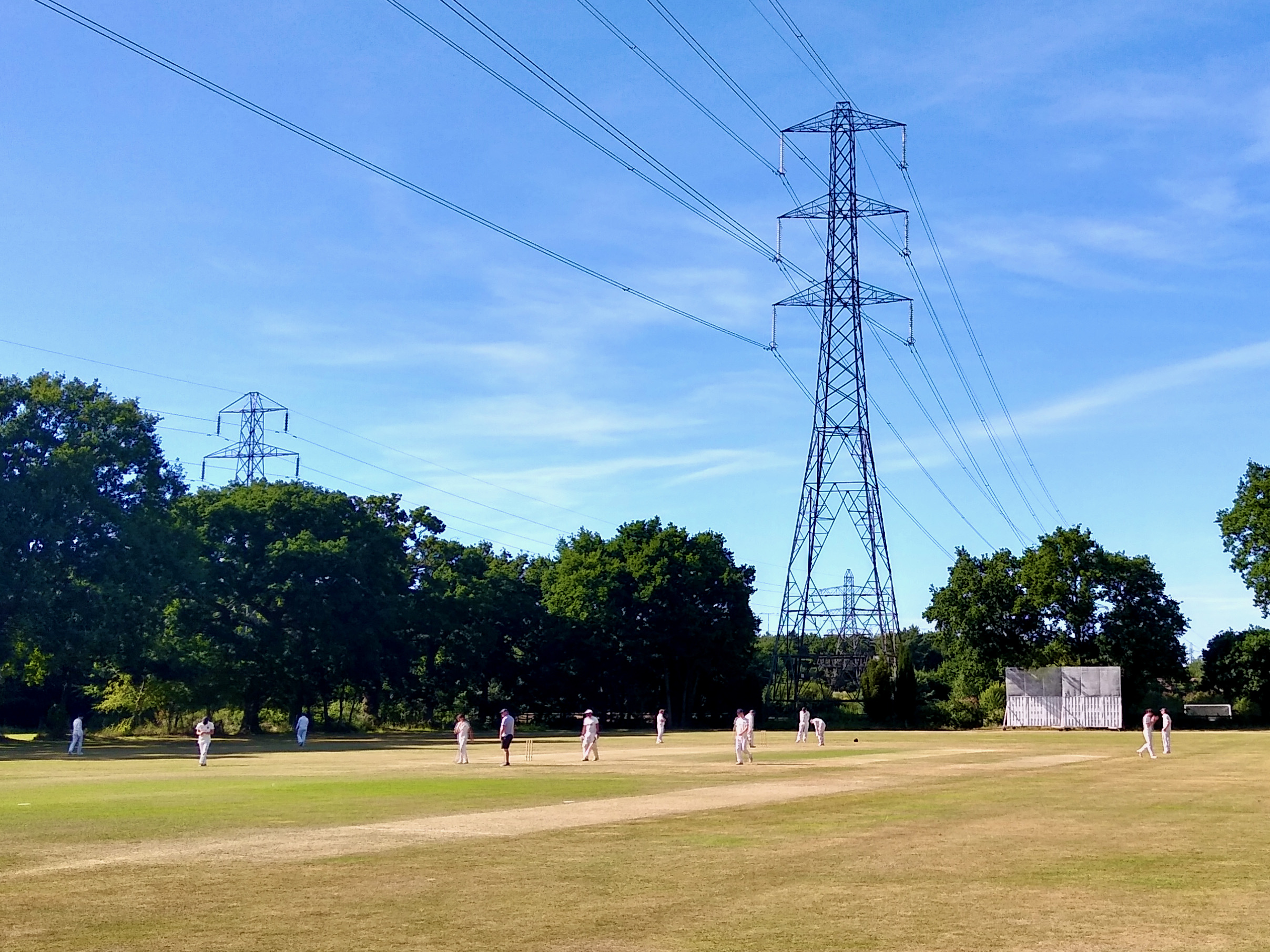
Byfleet Cricket Club, Parvis Road

Pyrford Cricket Club was founded in 1858 and its main ground is Pear Park on Coldharbour Road. Westfield Saints Cricket Club was founded in 1875 and plays its home games at Greenmead near Mayford.

Byfleet Cricket Club was founded in 1876 and has played its home games at the club ground in Parvis Road ever since. The first pavilion was constructed around 1890, and the current brick building dates from 1979. The unusual dimensions of the ground means that, since 1922, it has had two narrow cricket squares, laid end-to-end, rather than a single full-width square.

Woking and Horsell Cricket Club was founded in 1905 as Horsell Cricket Club. Initially, it played its home games at the Vicarage field, but moved in 1923 to its current ground on Brewery Road. The club adopted its current name in 1968. Old Woking Cricket Club was founded in 1962 and has played at its current ground, on Queen Elizabeth Way, since 1967. Previously known as Woking Remnants Cricket Club, it adopted its current name in 1997.

=== Hockey ===
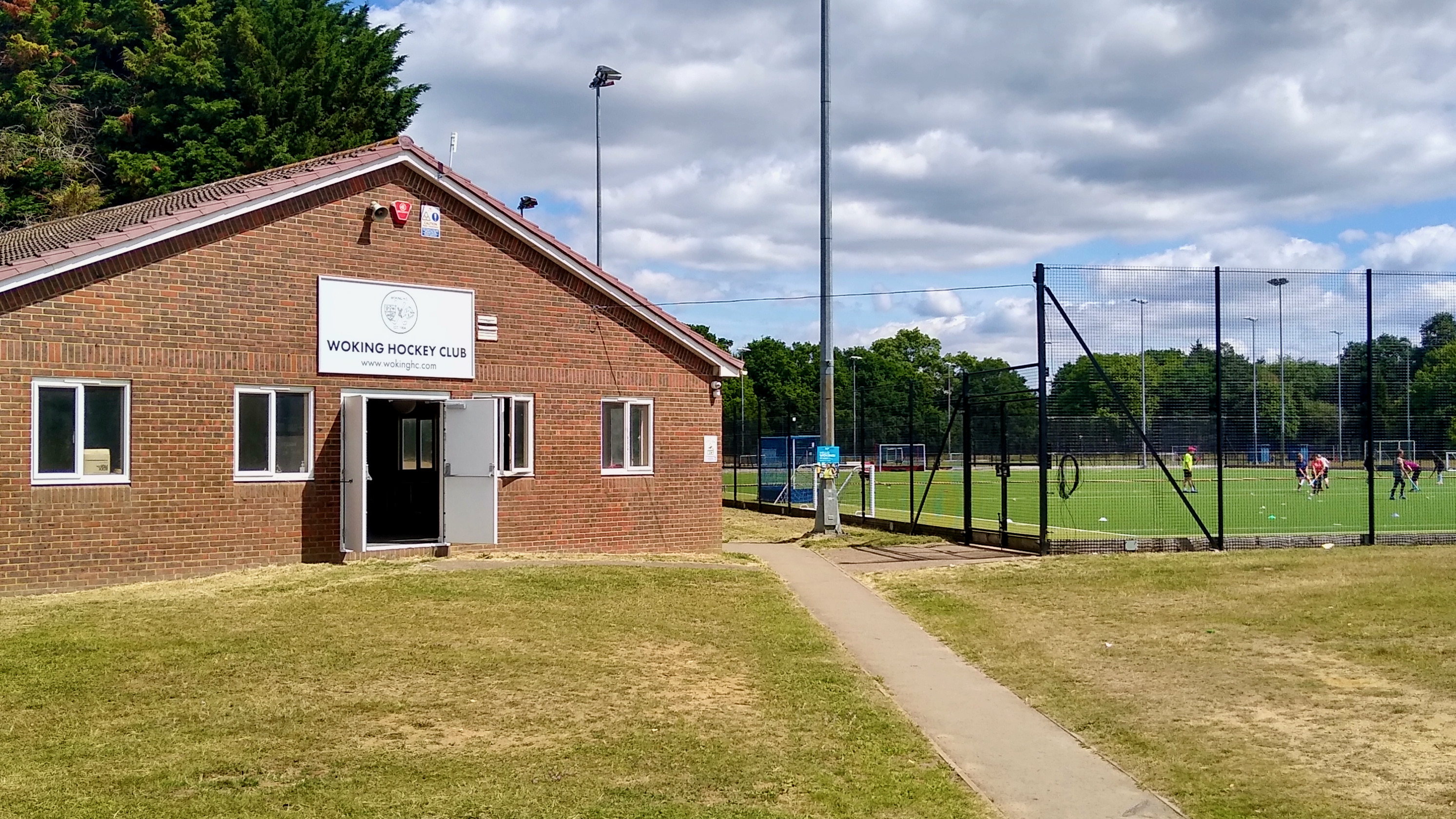
Woking Hockey Club, Goldsworth Park

Woking Hockey Club was founded in 1904. It is based at Goldsworth Park, and its facilities include two AstroTurf pitches. The Hockey Museum opened in Butts Road in 2012 and moved to its current premises in the High Street in December 2017.

=== Rugby ===
Woking Rugby Football Club (R.F.C.) traces its origins to Vickers R.F.C., which was founded in Byfleet in 1931. Following the closure of the British Aerospace (BAe) works at Brooklands in the late 1980s, the club was reformed under its current name in 1990. Initially, the club used the former BAe ground, but has played its home games at the Byfleet recreation ground since 1993. The Clubhouse is at the Camphill Social Club at West Byfleet.

== Notable buildings and landmarks ==
=== War memorials ===
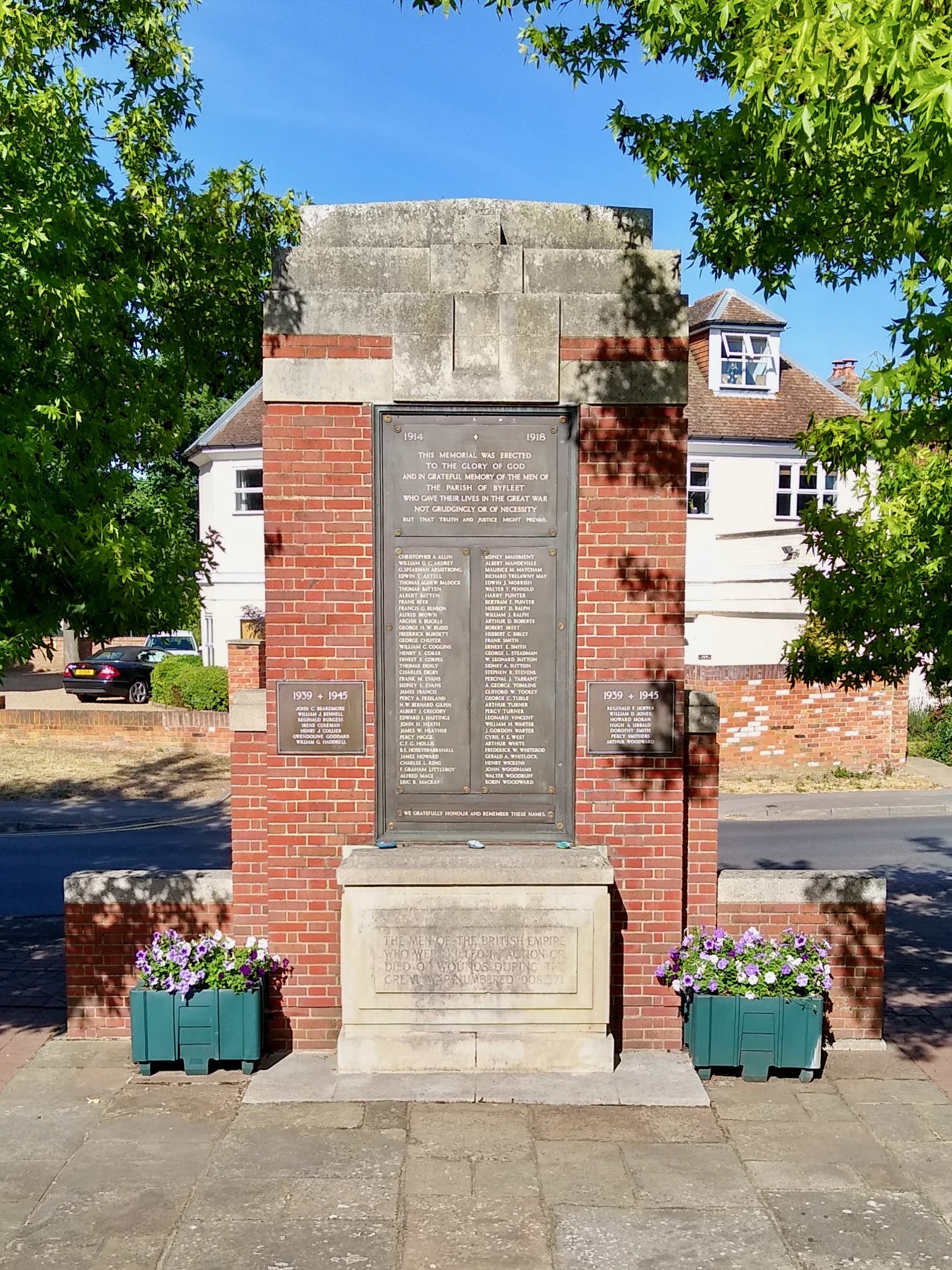
Byfleet War Memorial, High Road

Old Woking War Memorial was unveiled in November 1920 in St Peter's Churchyard. It takes the form of a Cornish granite wheel cross, decorated with Celtic-style tracery. There are two inscriptions on the base, one for each of the world wars, but no names are recorded on the memorial itself.

The Woking War Memorial was unveiled in Victoria Garden in May 1922 and moved to its current location in Jubilee Square in 1975. It consists of a sandstone column supporting a statue of a winged figure of Victory by the sculptor, Francis William Doyle Jones. The names of 520 people who died in the First World War are inscribed on the plinth, and a dedication to those who died in the Second was added in April 1950.

Byfleet War Memorial takes the form of a stone cenotaph, supported on a brick plinth. It records the names of 72 people who died in the First World War and of 14 people who died in the Second.

=== Woking Palace ===
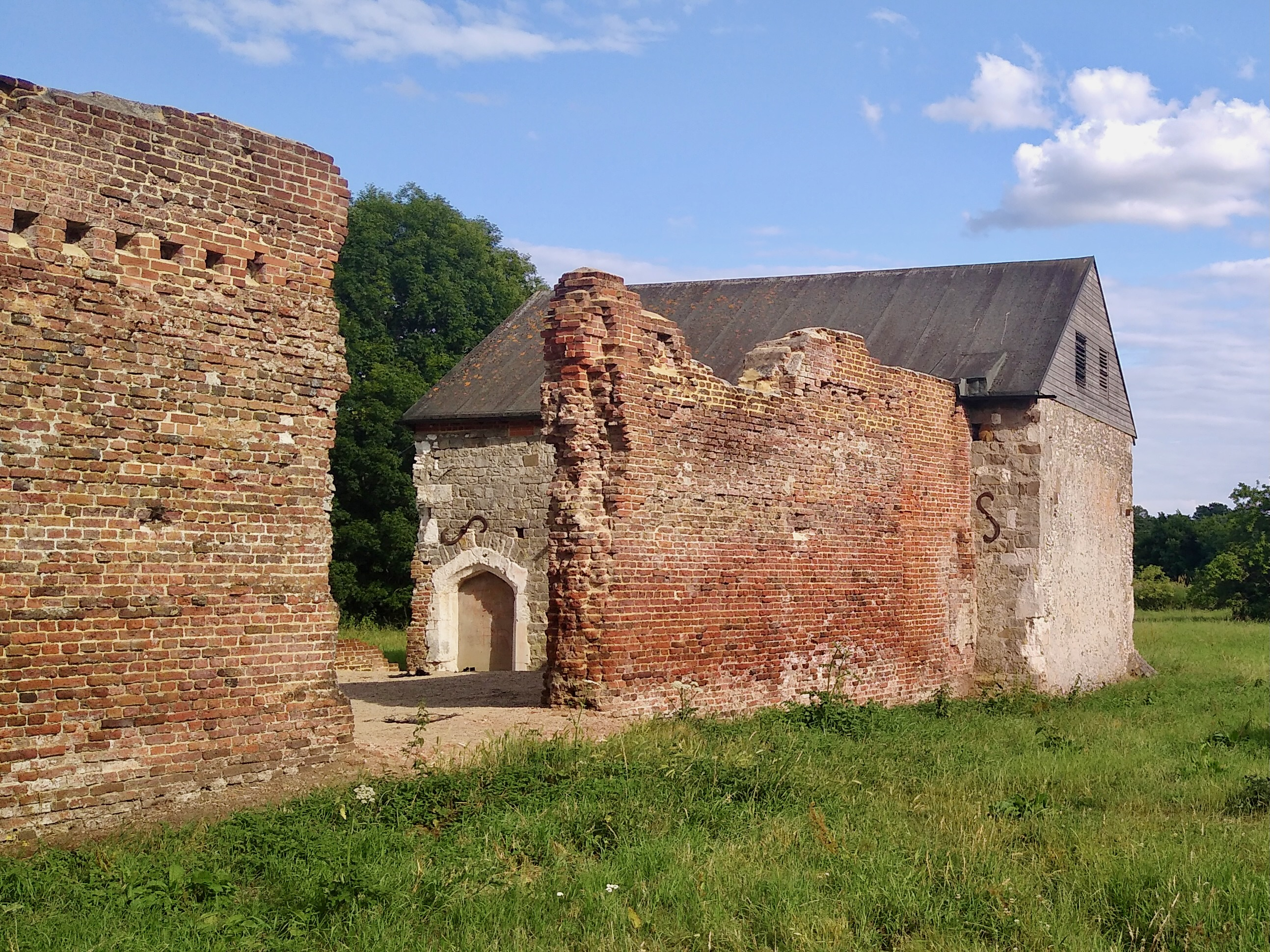
The ruins of Woking Palace in 2023. The stone building is an original part of the palace, but the brick walls are part of a 16th-century barn.

The first manor house on the site of Woking Palace is thought to have been built by Alan Basset, who was granted the manor by Richard I in 1189. (Note: The first surviving record of a manor house on the site of Woking Palace is from 1272.) The manor was held by various families, including the Bassets and Despensers, and, in the 15th century, the building was described as "substantial" and capable of accommodating up to 100 guests. In 1466, the manor was granted to Lady Margaret Beaufort, the mother of the future Henry VII, who lived there with her third husband, Henry Stafford, from 1467 until at least 1471.

The palace was frequently visited by Henry VII and his son, Henry VIII, who commissioned the construction of a new kitchen, royal apartments, a new wharf on the River Wey and two bowling alleys. Further improvement works were carried out during the reign of Elizabeth I. In contrast, James I is not thought to have taken any interest in Woking and the buildings were allowed to decay. In 1620, he granted the manor to Edward Zouch, who partly demolished the structure to provide building materials for a new house at Hoe Place. By the reign of Charles II, the site was being used as a farm, and the remaining buildings had probably been converted to barns. Today, the only visible traces of the palace are the perimeter moat (filled in the winter months), the former fishponds and a single stone building.

=== Other buildings ===
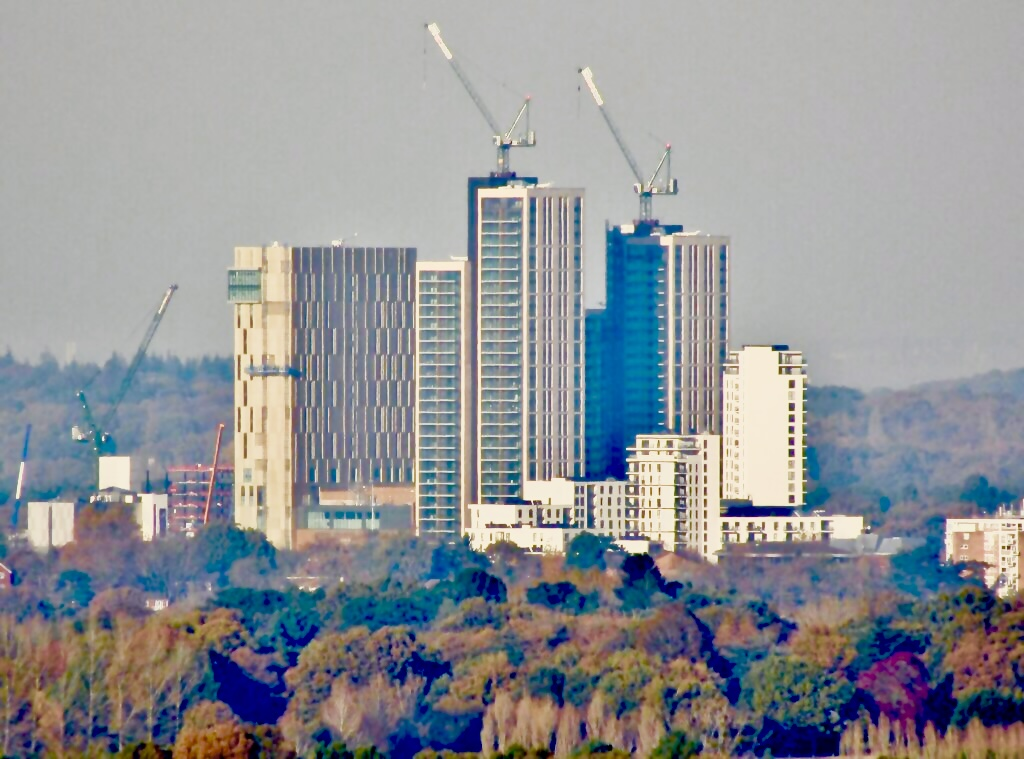
The Victoria Towers under construction in November 2020

The tallest buildings in Woking are Victoria Square Tower 1 and Tower 2 at 104 m (341 ft) and 98 m (322 ft) respectively, both built in 2020. The two buildings contain residential apartments and a third, the 23-storey Tower 3, has a Hilton Hotel. The project was designed by the architects' firm, Benoy, and was managed jointly by ThamesWey, a subsidiary of Woking Borough Council, and Moyallen Holdings Limited.

The 73 m-tall (240 ft) Export House was completed in 1974. It is known locally as "The BAT Building" (pronounced B-A-T), from the initials of its first tenant, British American Tobacco and has peregrine falcons nesting on top.

Woking Crematorium, close to St John's, was opened in March 1885 as the first purpose-built crematorium in the UK. The required land was purchased from the London Necropolis Company in 1878 by Sir Henry Thompson, founder of The Cremation Society. The crematory and columbarium were built in 1879 and the chapel was added in 1888.

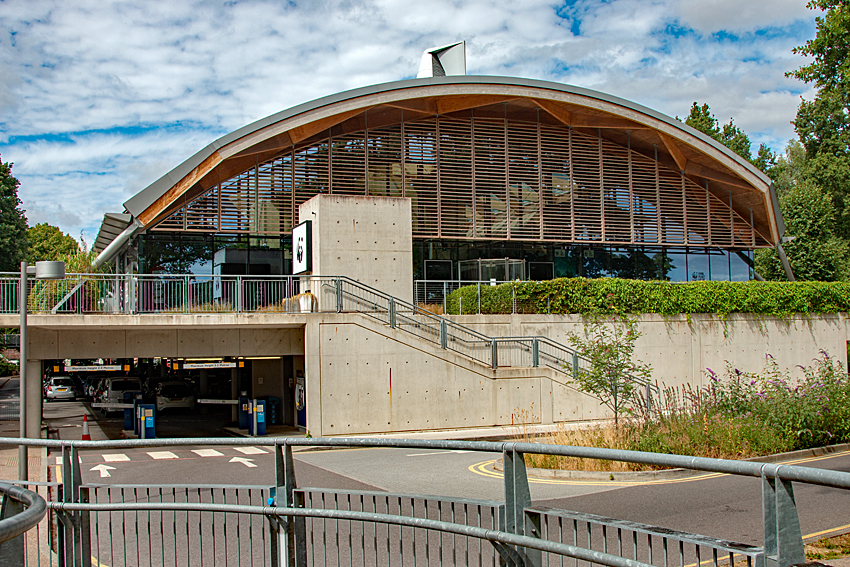
Living Planet Centre, Woking

The Living Planet Centre, to the north of the town centre, adjacent to the Basingstoke Canal, was opened in 2013 by David Attenborough. It was designed by Hopkins Architects and has a barrel-vaulted roof, which covers the central atrium. The building is the headquarters of the UK World Wide Fund for Nature and has a Learning Zone that is open to visitors.

The Surrey History Centre, in Goldsworth Road, was opened in March 1999 by Prince Charles. It was designed to replace the Surrey Record Office, which was previously based at Kingston upon Thames. The building also houses collections from the Guildford Muniment Room and the former Surrey Local Studies Library.

Sutton Place, was built for Richard Weston c. 1525 and is one of the earliest unfortified houses constructed in England. The present house was constructed as a replacement for the medieval manor house of Sutton, which had been described as "ruinous" in 1329. It was originally built around four sides of a central courtyard, but the north range was demolished in 1786. The building includes a two-storey great hall, decorated with royal coats of arms, and a panelled long gallery.

== Parks and open spaces ==
=== Horsell Common ===
Horsell Common is a 355 ha (880-acre) open space, owned and managed by the Horsell Common Preservation Society. Some 152 ha (380 acres) are designated a biological Site of Special Scientific Interest and form part of the Thames Basin Heaths Special Protection Area. The common includes a range of heathland habitats, including acid grassland and peat bogs. It is noted for the diversity of insects, and it provides a habitat for 168 Hymenoptera (bees, wasps and ants) species. Rare plants found in the area include marsh pennywort, the lesser water-plantain and three-lobed water crowfoot.

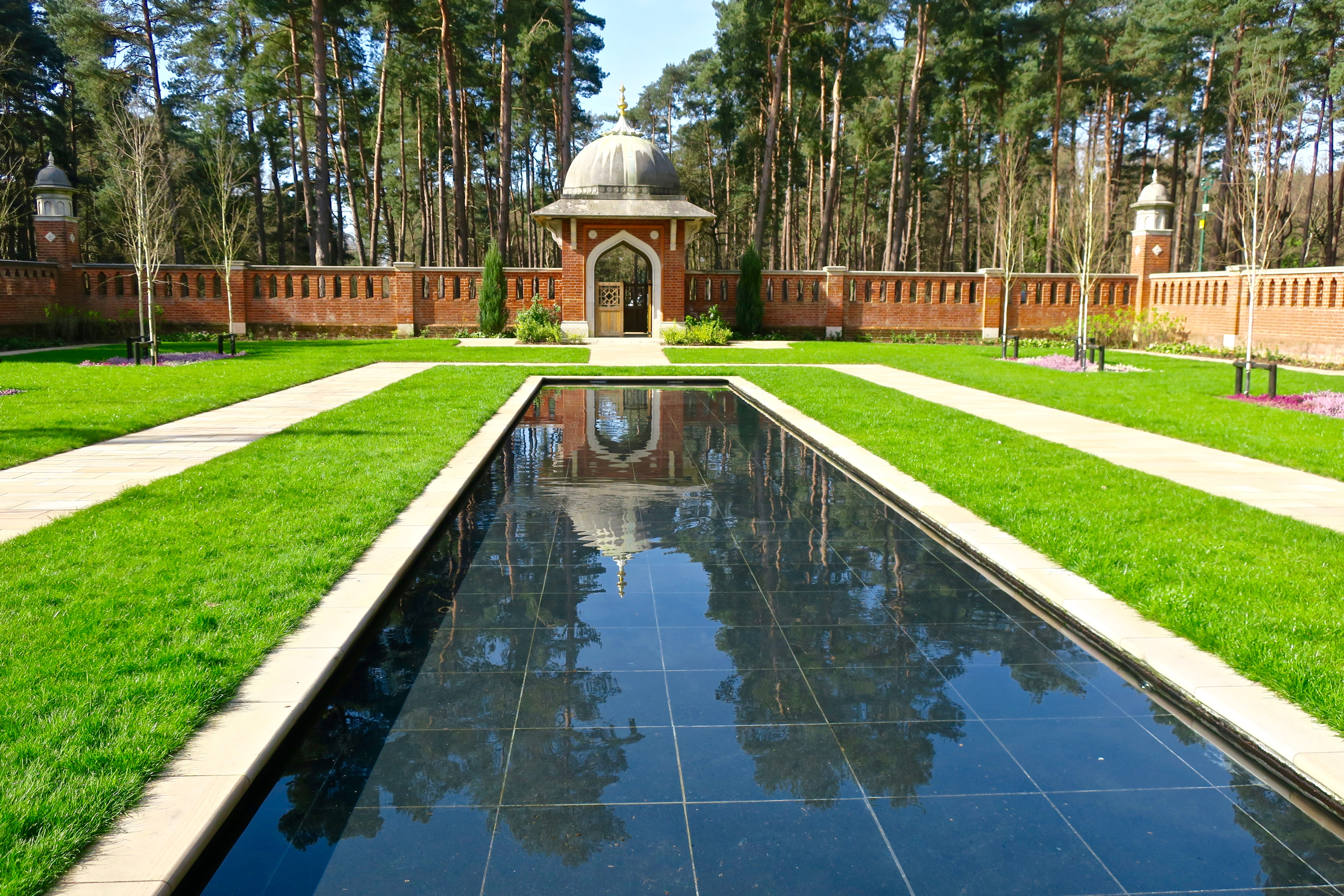
The Peace Garden at the Muslim Burial Ground

The Muslim Burial Ground on Monument Road was completed in 1917 as the resting place for Muslim soldiers from British India who died in the First World War. It was designed by T. Herbery Winny, and the rectangular enclosure is surrounded by 2.5 m-high (8.2 ft) walls. The entrance gate takes the form of a red brick chattri with a central dome. In 1921, the site was taken over by the Commonwealth War Graves Commission, by which time 19 soldiers had been buried there. A further eight soldiers who died in the Second World War were subsequently interred at the ground.

After repeated instances of vandalism, the soldiers were exhumed in 1968 and reburied at Brookwood Cemetery. In the following decades, the site was neglected and became overgrown. In 2011, a restoration of the burial ground, part-funded by English Heritage, began. A memorial garden, known as the Peace Garden, was created at the site, centred around a rectangular reflecting pool. A Himalayan birch tree was planted for each of the 27 soldiers who had previously been buried at the site. The Peace Garden was opened in November 2015 by Prince Edward, Earl of Wessex.

=== Other parks and open spaces ===
The land for Brookwood Cemetery was purchased by the London Necropolis Company in 1854 and the southern part of the site was consecrated as an Anglican burial ground in November of that year. The northern part, closer to Brookwood station, was designated a non-conformist cemetery. The initial designs for the area were by the company architect, Henry Abraham, but the chapels were designed by his successor, Sydney Smirke. Smirke, working in collaboration with William Broderick Thomas, was responsible for design of the landscaping, including the extensive planting of evergreen trees and shrubs. The site remains a working cemetery; by 2009, over 233,300 people had been buried there.

In 1917, a military cemetery was laid out to the west of the main site and was subsequently extended to receive those who died in the Second World War. The area was acquired by the Commonwealth War Graves Commission in 1919 and is now closed for new burials.

The 18.6 ha (46-acre) Brookwood Country Park, to the south of Knaphill, is on the north bank of the Basingstoke Canal. Much of the site is a semi-natural green space with four wildlife ponds, but it also has two football pitches and a sports pavilion. The country park is managed by Woking Borough Council and has been protected by the charity, Fields in Trust, under the Queen Elizabeth II Fields programme, since January 2013.

Smart's Heath and Prey Heath, to the south west of Mayford, together comprise the 38 ha (94-acre) Smart's and Prey Heaths Site of Special Scientific Interest. The two adjacent areas are separated by the Hoe Stream and are managed by the borough council. They were not included in the land purchase by the London Necropolis Company in 1854 and have remained as areas of common land ever since. The heaths provide a habitat for the European nightjar and two insectivorous plant species, the long-leaved and round-leaved sundews.

Until the early 20th century, the area now occupied by Woking Park was open farmland. It was sold to the UDC in 1902 by the Brettel family on the condition that it would be used as a recreation ground and public park. The two ponds in the centre of the park provide a habitat for frogs, birds, ferns and aquatic plants.

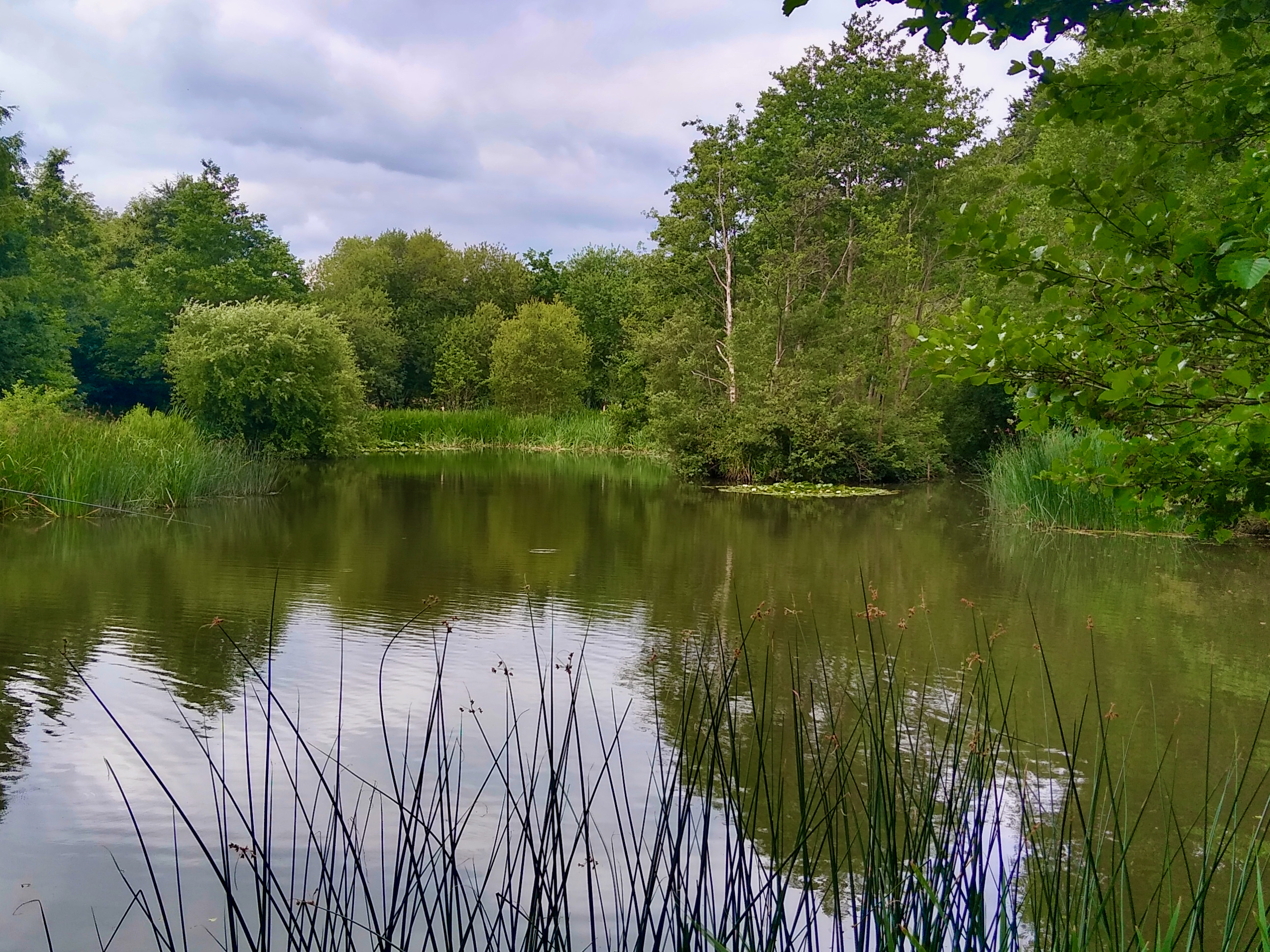
A small fishing lake at Brookwood Country Park

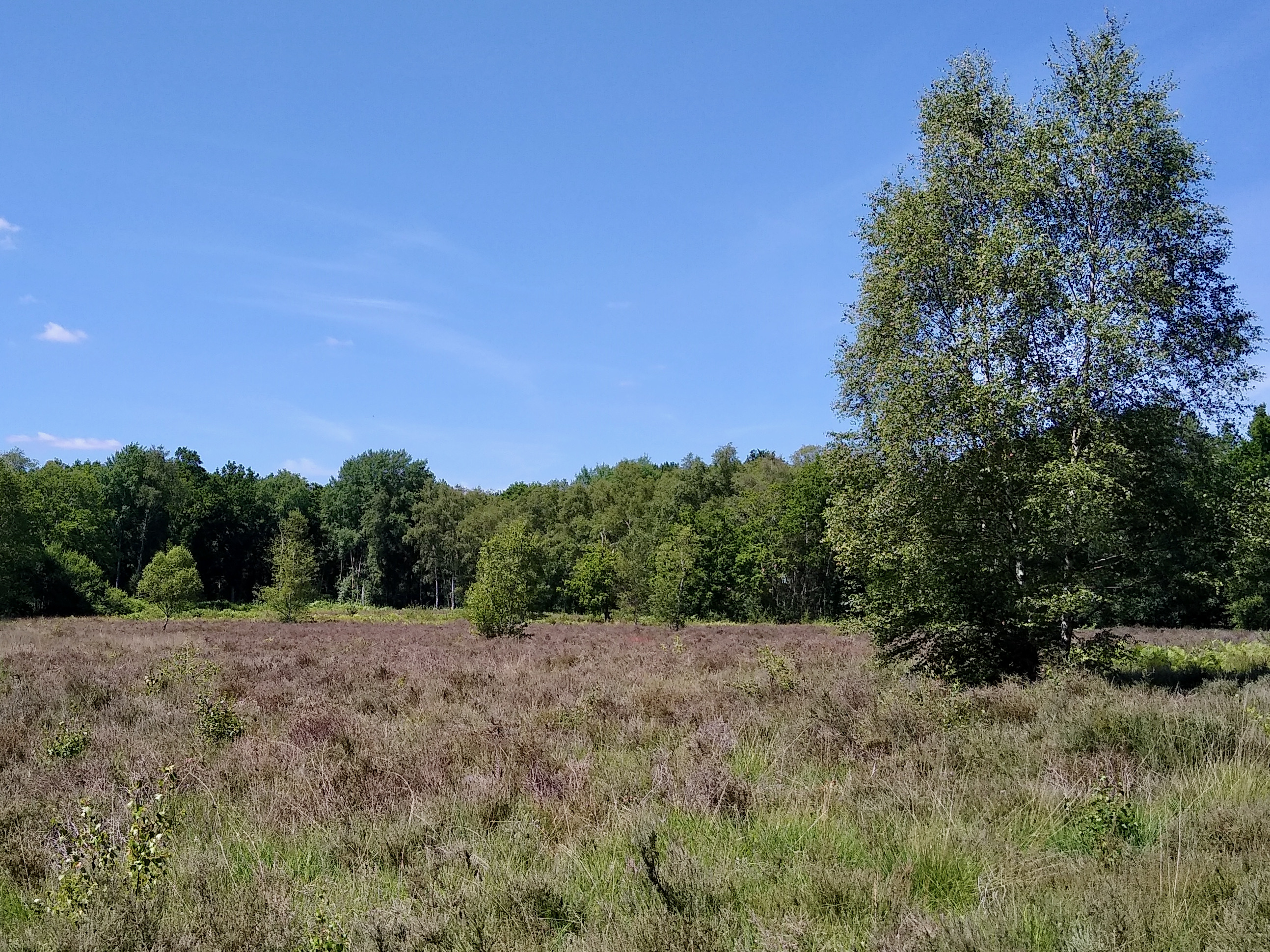
Smart's Heath, near Mayford

== Notable people ==
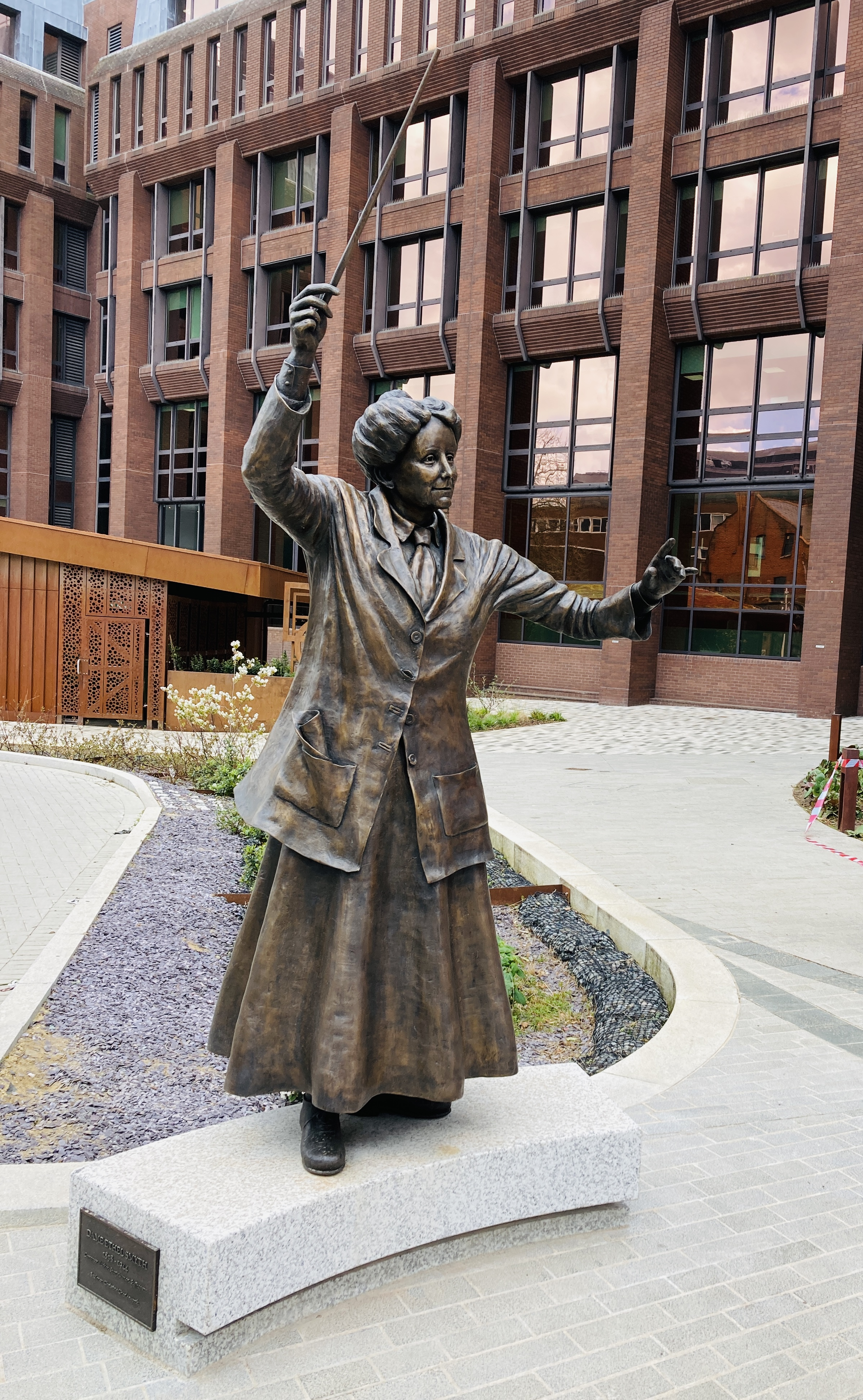
Statue of Ethel Smyth, Dukes Court Plaza, Woking

- Lady Margaret Beaufort (c. 1441 – 1509), mother of Henry VII – lived at Woking Palace 1467–1471. (Note: Margaret Beaufort and her third husband, Henry Stafford were granted the Manor of Woking in 1466, but did not take up residence until March the following year. After Stafford died in 1471, it appears that Beaufort did not visit Woking regularly. However, she retained the title of Lord of the Manor until her own death in 1509.)
- Emilia Dilke (1840–1904), art historian, feminist and trade unionist – lived at Pyrford Rough from 1881 until her death.
- Arthur Balfour, 1st Earl of Balfour (1848–1930), former Prime Minister (1902–1905), later author of the Balfour Declaration on a Jewish homeland, lived at Fisher's Hill, Hook Heath Road, from January 1929 until his death.
- Robert Ogilvie (1852–1938), English footballer, captain of the Clapham Rovers team that won the 1880 FA Cup Final, died at Golf Cottage, St John's, Woking.
- Gerald Balfour, 2nd Earl of Balfour (1853–1945; brother of the 1st Earl), Conservative former cabinet minister, lived at Fisher's Hill, Hook Heath Road from 1901.
- George Bernard Shaw (1856–1950), playwright and political activist – lived in The Ridge, Woking from 1901 to 1903
- Ethel Smyth (1858–1944), composer and suffragette – lived at Coign, Hook Heath Road from 1910 until her death.
- H. G. Wells (1866–1946), writer – lived in Maybury Road 1895–1898.
- Elizabeth Balfour, Countess of Balfour (1867–1942; wife of the 2nd Earl), suffragette – lived at Fisher's Hill, Hook Heath Road from 1901 until her death.
- Thomas Breakwell (1872–1902) first Englishman to convert to the Baháʼí Faith, was born in Woking.
- Adelina de Lara (1872–1961) concert pianist and composer – lived in Woking from the 1920s until her death.
- Rupert Guinness, 2nd Earl of Iveagh (1874–1967), businessman and philanthropist – lived at Pyrford from 1906 until his death.
- Marjorie Proops (1911–1996), journalist and agony aunt – was born at Woking.
- Eric Bedser (1918–2006) and Sir Alec Bedser (1918–2010), twin-brother cricketers – lived in the Woking area for the majority of their lives and attended Monument Hill Central School.
- John Braine (1922–1986), novelist – lived in Woking from 1966 until his death.
- Delia Smith (b. 1941) celebrity chef and television presenter – was born in Woking.
- Jeremy Child (1944-2022), actor – was born in Woking.
- Ron Dennis (b. 1947), founder of McLaren Group – was born and lives in Woking.
- Gary Daniels (b. 1963), actor and martial artist – was born in Woking.
- Sean Lock (1963–2021), comedian – grew up in Woking and attended John the Baptist School.
- Paul Weller (b. 1958), singer-songwriter and musician – was born in Woking and attended Sheerwater County Secondary School.
- Susie Dent (b. 1964), lexicographer, etymologist, and media personality - was born in Woking.

== Bibliography ==
- Adams, Douglas; Lloyd, John (1990). The deeper meaning of Liff. London: Pan Books Ltd. ISBN 978-0-33-031606-4.
- Blair, John (1991). Early Medieval Surrey: Landholding, Church and Settlement Before 1300. Stroud: Alan Sutton. ISBN 978-0-86-299780-9.
- Brandon, David; Brooke, Alan (2008). London: City of the Dead. Stroud: The History Press. ISBN 978-0-75-094633-9.
- Clarke, John M. (2004). London's Necropolis. Stroud: Sutton Publishing. ISBN 978-0-7509-3513-5.
- Clarke, John M. (2006). The Brookwood Necropolis Railway. Locomotion Papers. Vol. 143 (4th ed.). Usk, Monmouthshire: The Oakwood Press. ISBN 978-0-85-361655-9.
- Cole, David (1980). The work of Sir Gilbert Scott. London: Architectural Press. ISBN 978-0-85-139723-8.
- Conan Doyle, Arthur (1894). The Memoirs of Sherlock Holmes. London: Newnes.
- Cotton, Jonathan; Crocker, Glenys; Graham, Audrey, eds. (2004). Aspects of archaeology and history in Surrey. Guildford: Surrey Archaeological Society. ISBN 978-0-95-414603-0.
- Crocker, Glenys (1999). Surrey's Industrial Past. Guildford: Surrey Industrial History Group. ISBN 978-0-95-239188-3.
- Crook, Paul (2000). Surrey Home Guard. Midhurst: Middleton Press. ISBN 1-901-70657-5.
- Crosby, Alan (2003). Woking. Chichester: Phillimore. ISBN 978-1-86-077262-7.
- Davis, Sharon (1999). '80s chart toppers: every chart-topper tells a story. Edinburgh: Mainstream. ISBN 978-1-85-158838-1.
- de Gray Birch, Walter, ed. (2012). Cartularium Saxonium. Vol. I. doi:10.1017/CBO9781139177313. ISBN 978-1-13-917731-3.
- Dines, HG; Edmunds, FH; Chatwin, CP (1929). The geology of the country around Aldershot and Guildford: Explanation of one-inch geological sheet 286, new series. London: British Geological Survey. Archived from the original on 2 June 2022.
- Field, Marion (2012). Woking: A history and celebration. Salisbury: Francis Frith. ISBN 978-1-84-589667-6.
- Field, Marion (2017). Woking in 50 Buildings. Stroud: Amberley Books. ISBN 978-1-44-566538-2.
- Gover, J.E.B; Mawer, A.; Stenton, F.M. (1969). The place-names of Surrey. Cambridge: Cambridge University Press.
- Hadfield, Charles (1969). The Canals of South and South-East England. David and Charles. ISBN 978-0-71-534693-8.
- Jackson, Alan A. (1999). The Railway in Surrey. Penryn: Atlantic Transport Publishers. ISBN 978-0-90-689990-8.
- Jones, Michael K.; Underwood, Malcolm G. (1992). The King's mother: Lady Margaret Beaufort, Countess of Richmond and Derby. Cambridge: Cambridge University Press. ISBN 978-0-52-144794-2.
- Kümin, Beat A (1996). The shaping of a community: the rise and reformation of the English parish, c. 1400-1560. Aldershot: Scholar. ISBN 978-1-85-928164-2.
- Malden, H.E., ed. (1911). A History of the County of Surrey. Vol. 3. London: Victoria County History. Archived from the original on 28 January 2021.
- Mills, A.D. (2003). Oxford Dictionary of British Place Names. Oxford: Oxford University Press. ISBN 978-0-19-852758-9.
- Mitchell, Vic; Smith, Keith (1986). Waterloo to Woking. Midhurst: Middleton Press. ISBN 978-0-90-652038-3.
- Mitchell, Vic; Smith, Keith (1988). Woking to Southampton. Midhurst: Middleton Press. ISBN 978-0-90-652055-0.
- Ogley, Bob (1995). Surrey at War. Westerham: Froglets Publications Ltd. ISBN 1-872337-70-8.
- Sinclair, David (2009). Spice Girls Revisited: How The Spice Girls Reinvented Pop. London: Omnibus Press. ISBN 978-0-85-712111-0.
- Smith, Daniel (2014) [2009]. The Sherlock Holmes Companion: An Elementary Guide (Updated ed.). London: Aurum Press. ISBN 978-1-78-131404-3.
- Vine, P.A.L (1994). London's lost route to Basingstoke (2nd ed.). Stroud: Sutton Publishing. ISBN 978-0-75-090359-2.
- Wakeford, Iain (1987). Woking 150: The history of Woking and its railway. Woking: Mayford & Woking District History Society. ISBN 978-0-95-026751-7.
- Wakeford, Iain (1995). A guide to the industrial history of Woking and its borough. Guildford: Surrey Industrial History Group. ISBN 978-0-95-239180-7.
- Wakeford, Iain (2003). Woking town centre: An illustrated history. Iain Wakeford.
