= List of places of worship in Woking (borough) =

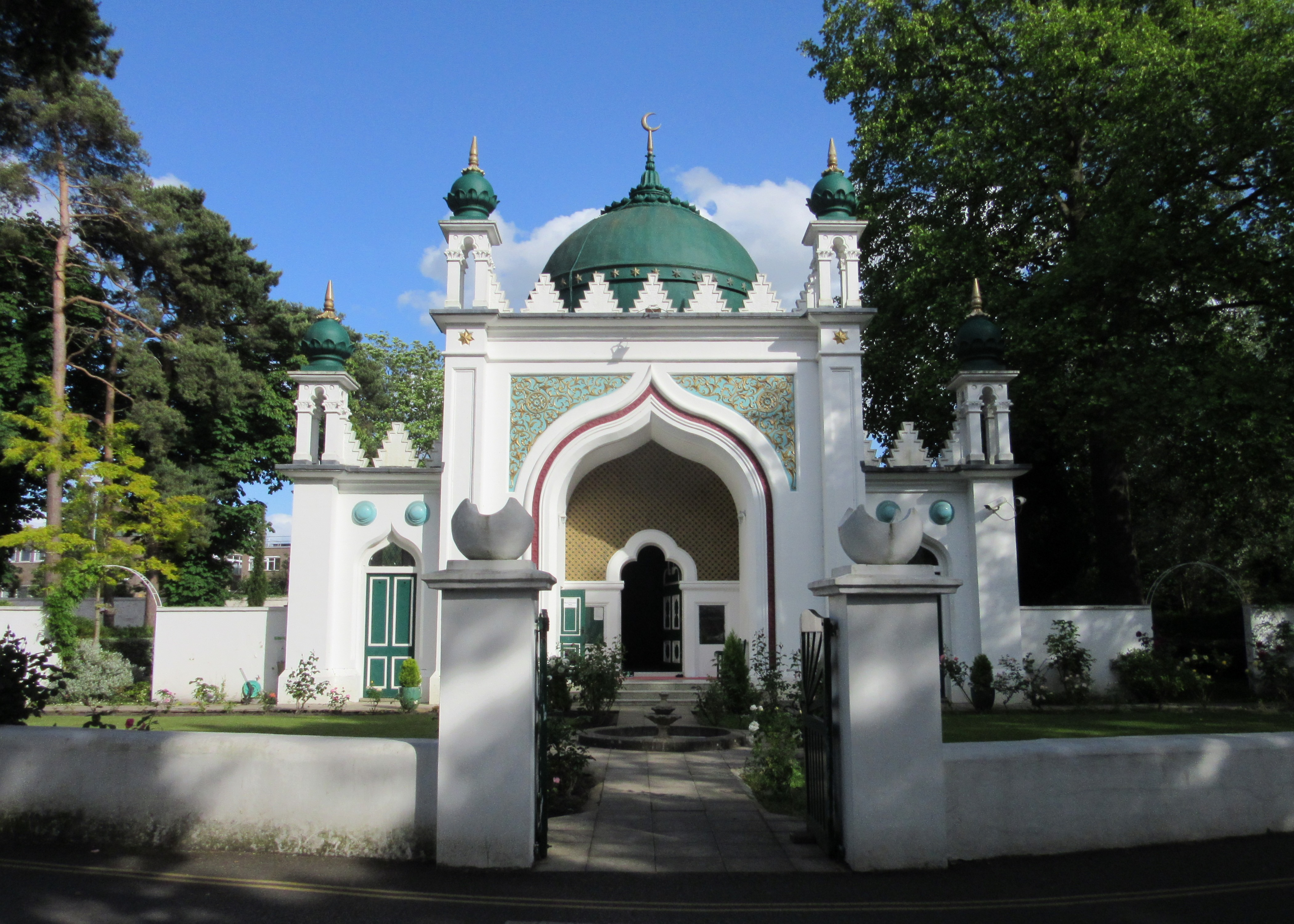
Shah Jahan Mosque was Britain's first mosque and "perhaps the most historically significant of the town's buildings, as well as one of the most beautiful".

There are more than 50 current and former places of worship in the borough of Woking, one of 11 local government districts in the English county of Surrey. The mostly urban area, centred on the Victorian railway town of Woking, is ethnically and demographically diverse. As well as churches and chapels representing England's main Christian denominations, Woking is home to Britain's oldest purpose built mosque, a Buddhist temple and an Eastern Orthodox church (part of a monastery and shrine to Edward the Martyr, who is buried there). Anglican parish churches in surrounding villages such as Pyrford, Old Woking and Byfleet are among the oldest buildings in the borough.

Eleven places of worship in the borough have listed status. A building is defined as "listed" when it is placed on a statutory register of buildings of "special architectural or historic interest" in accordance with the Planning (Listed Buildings and Conservation Areas) Act 1990. The Department for Culture, Media and Sport, a Government department, is responsible for this; Historic England (formerly English Heritage), a non-departmental public body, acts as an agency of the department to administer the process and advise the department on relevant issues. There are three grades of listing status. Grade I, the highest, is defined as being of "exceptional interest"; Grade II* is used for "particularly important buildings of more than special interest"; and Grade II, the lowest, is used for buildings of "special interest". As of February 2001, there were four Grade I-listed buildings, eight with Grade II* status and 50 Grade II-listed buildings in Woking borough. The Shah Jahan Mosque was upgraded from Grade II* to Grade I status in March 2018.

== Overview of the borough and its places of worship ==
Woking borough is in the northwest of Surrey.

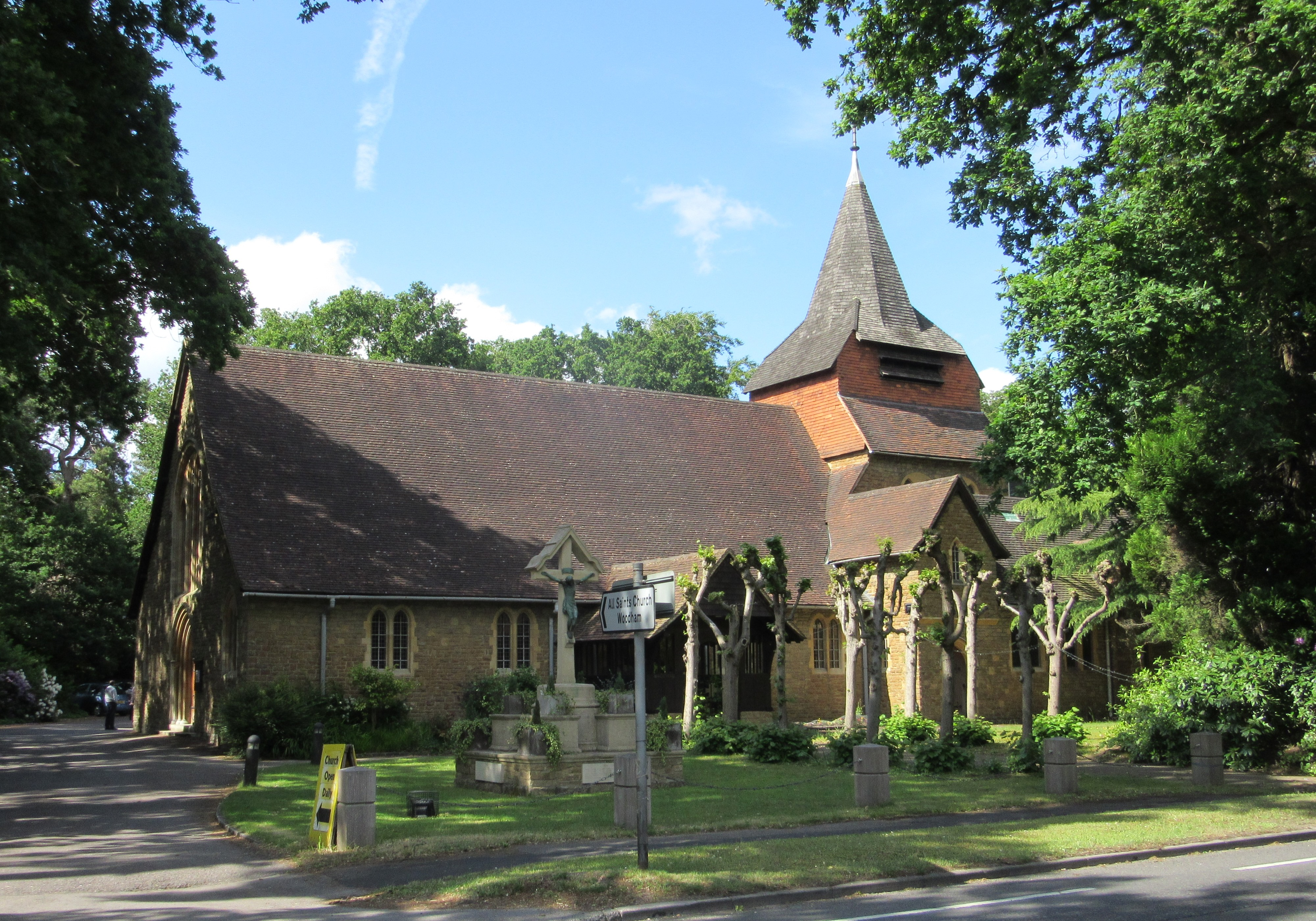
Several Anglican churches were built around the turn of the 20th century, including All Saints, Woodham (1893).

One of 11 local government districts in the county of Surrey, the borough of Woking covers 6,357 hectares (15,710 acres) and had a population of 99,198 at the time of the United Kingdom Census 2011. The population rose by more than 10% between 2001 and 2011: more than 3,100 houses were built across the borough, which nevertheless retains much green space (more than 60% of the land area is covered by Green belt legislation). The town of Woking is the main population centre: its population was nearly 63,000 at the time of the United Kingdom Census 2001. The smaller towns of Knaphill (10,062), Byfleet (6,995) and West Byfleet (5,054), and the villages of Brookwood and Mayford, surround Woking town.

Woking "was a market town in the 17th century, although a little-known one". Its centre was what is now known as the Old Woking area, nearly 2 miles (3.2 km) southeast of the present town centre. The surrounding area consisted of heathland with very poor soil—mostly of the acidic Bagshot Formation but with some alluvium and gravel associated with the Wey Valley. A few ancient trackways, all surviving as important roads, crossed the heath: the most significant was the Guildford–Chertsey road, which connected with routes from [Old] Woking to Byfleet, to Chertsey, to Knaphill and to Horsell; Horsell to Westfield and to Chobham; and Knaphill to Pyrford. The modern town and borough grew around these roads and villages, but the area was remote and thinly populated during the medieval period. From that era survives St Peter's Church in Old Woking and the parish churches of the nearby villages of Horsell, Byfleet and Pyrford, all now subsumed by the growing town. The Basingstoke Canal was dug across Woking Common in 1794, and the South West Main Line, one of southern England's most important railway lines, was built parallel to it in 1838. The opening of Woking railway station, and the construction of an important branch line to Guildford and Portsmouth from 1845, put in place the foundations for the modern town to grow. By the time the railway opened, the four rural medieval churches were no longer adequate for the developing town. Built next to the canal in 1842, St John the Baptist's Church was the first of many Anglican places of worship to be built in modern Woking. The church founded five others around the borough as the population grew: Knaphill (1885 in a tin tabernacle; permanent church opened in 1907), Christ Church in the town centre (1889), Mayford (1905 as a mission hall; new church opened in 1992) Brookwood (1909), and Goldsworth Park (1988). Christ Church founded its own daughter church, St Paul's, in 1895; and the Woodham and Mount Hermon areas gained Anglican churches in 1893 and 1907 respectively. Temporary tin tabernacles served West Byfleet and Sutton Green until permanent churches were built in 1910 and 1921 respectively, and postwar churches were founded at Pyrford (complementing the ancient parish church to the south) and Sheerwater.

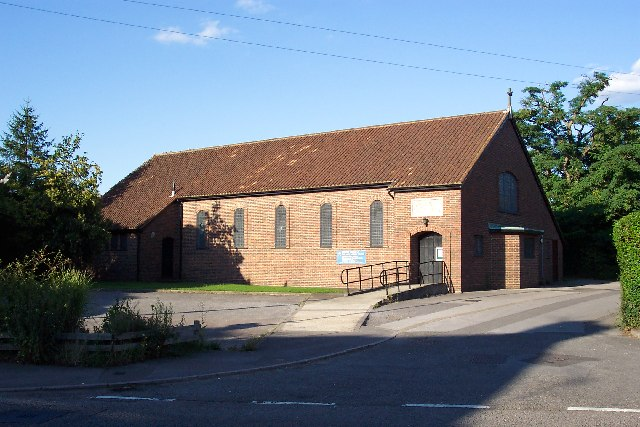
The Catholic church at Kingfield was demolished when the new St Dunstan's Church was built.

Roman Catholic worship takes place at the large modern St Dunstan's Church, opened in 2008, and at smaller churches in Knaphill, West Byfleet and Sutton Park. The present St Dunstan's is the third church to bear that dedication: others were in Percy Street in the town centre (a tin tabernacle erected in 1899) and White Rose Lane south of the railway. The latter was built in 1924–27 to the design of J. Goldie and G.R. Gilbertson Topham. A large site formerly occupied by a Catholic school became available in 2006, and the Diocese of Arundel and Brighton decided to consolidate services at a single modern building. It raised money by closing and selling the old St Dunstan's Church and a small postwar church in the Kingfield suburb, which was demolished for housing after planning permission was granted in 2005. West Byfleet is served by one Catholic church (dedicated to Our Lady Help of Christians), but its parish had three for a time: St John the Evangelist's Church on the Sheerwater estate opened in 1961 but closed 34 years later, and St Thomas More's Church served Byfleet village from 1973 until 2006. On the southern edge of the borough near Guildford is the Sutton Place mansion and country estate which has its own Catholic church. St Edward the Confessor's Church dates from 1876 and is part of Guildford Catholic parish.

The United Kingdom Census 1851 included questions about religious worship and was used to measure church attendance and the strength of Nonconformist groups. It revealed that Nonconformism in the Woking area was well above the average for Surrey, in particular at Horsell where the proportion of residents attending non-Anglican services was among the highest in the county. Church attendance of any type was lower overall, though: the remoteness of Woking at the time encouraged small groups and breakaway sects. As late as 1882, the pastor of the isolated Baptist mission chapel at Anthonys bemoaned the lack of religious knowledge and general education among residents of that part of Horsell Common.

The first local Nonconformist chapel stood next to the present New Life Baptist Church in Old Woking, but the two are not directly related. Independent Baptists led by the Hoad family from a nearby farm started meeting in 1770 and built a place of worship in 1782. William Huntington was associated with the cause for a time during his period of ministering in Surrey. Worshippers were attracted from many local villages, and informal meetings took place in Knaphill and Horsell by the early 19th century. A chapel (no longer extant) was built in the latter in 1848. People who followed the divergent Strict and Particular Baptist cause were catered for by the Horsell Common Chapel, built in front of two houses facing the common in 1816, by a chapel at Mayford (founded by 1824 and in use until the 20th century), and by Providence Chapel at Knaphill (founded in the 1860s and still in use). Meanwhile, the first General Baptist place of worship in Woking town centre dated from 1879 (as a house church; permanent church from 1884) as an outreach from Addlestone. Town-centre redevelopment caused the congregation to move to a new building in 1977, but this now identifies as a Newfrontiers Evangelical church. Geographically, New Life Baptist Church brought Woking's Baptist history full circle when it was founded as Kingfield Baptist Church in 1929. The old Independent chapel no longer survives but still stood in the mid-20th century, being used as a garage.

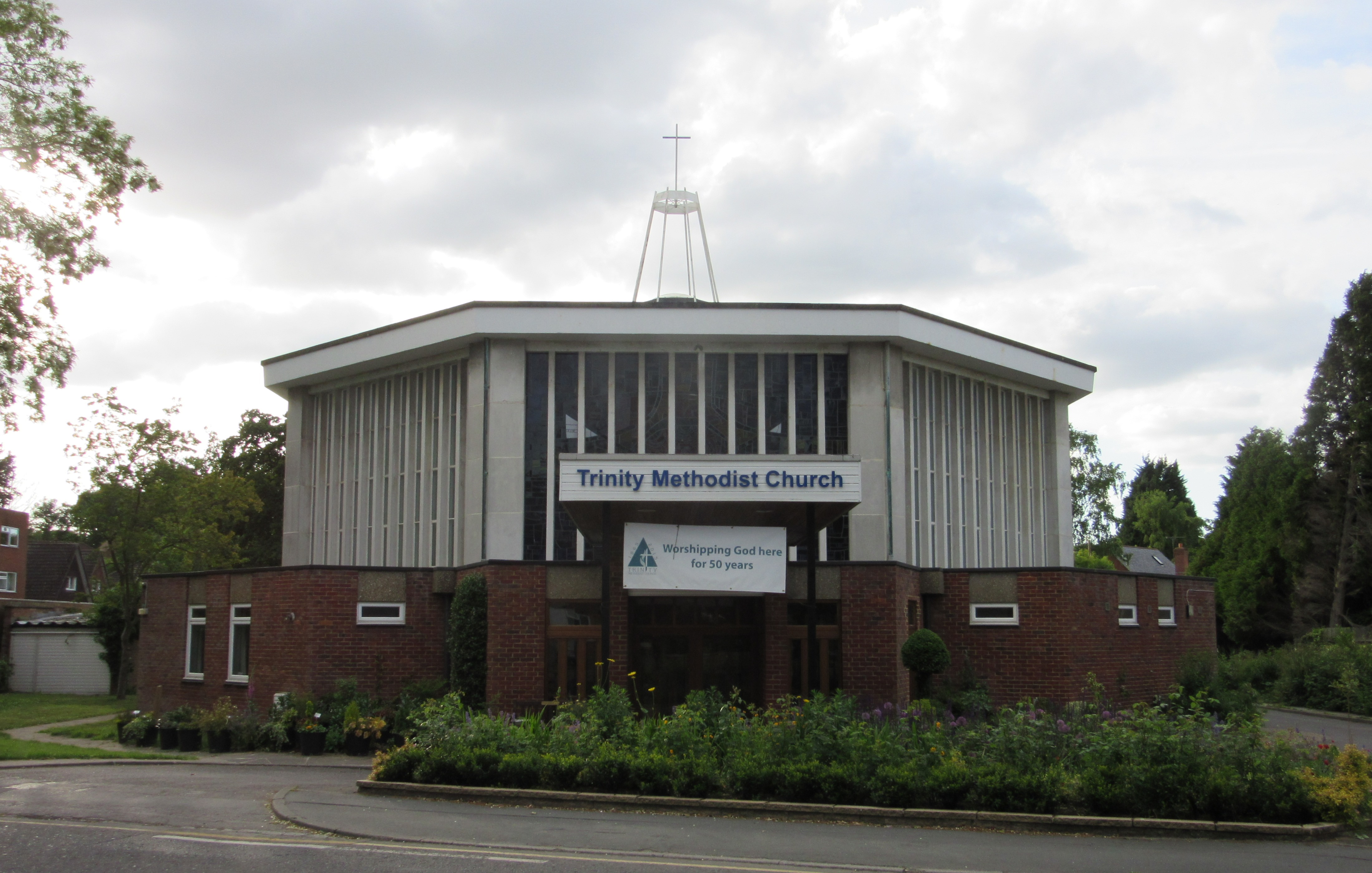
Trinity Methodist Church (1965) is now the main church of that denomination in the borough.

None of the borough's original Methodist places of worship survive, from either the Primitive or the Wesleyan branches of that denomination. The first Nonconformist chapel in "new" Woking was a Primitive Methodist chapel on College Road, built in 1863 but no longer extant. Another in Brookwood was used by Jehovah's Witnesses for many years after it closed but has now been demolished. Originally registered for marriages in March 1916, it survived in Methodist use until November 1976. The first meeting place for Wesleyan Methodist worship was a Wesleyan school on Chapel Street, used until a purpose-built chapel was erected next to it in 1884. It was extended in 1893 but was superseded 11 years later by a tall, landmark chapel diagonally opposite, with a corner tower and spire. Just over 60 years later the congregation moved again: Trinity Methodist Church opened on 12 June 1965 and the 1904 church was sold as part of the town centre redevelopment scheme—but burnt down before anything could be done. The original 1893 chapel was demolished in the 1970s after the town's new library opened. Knaphill's original Wesleyan chapel (1867) had to be replaced in 1935 by the present building because of concerns over its structural integrity. A short-lived Wesleyan chapel in the St John's area of Woking was in existence by the late 1890s but soon closed and was used as a car garage before being demolished and replaced by a larger garage and showroom. It stood at the junction of St John's Hill Road and St John's Road next to the Basingstoke Canal. The Methodist Statistical Returns published in 1947 (Note: The statistical return was compiled between 1940 and 1947 with the aim of documenting all Methodist chapels extant at that time: their location, previous affiliation prior to the Methodist Union of 1932, capacity, building materials and similar details.) recorded the existence of the Brookwood, Byfleet, Knaphill and central Woking chapels and another on Walton Road in Woking, a 150-capacity building originally provided for Primitive Methodists.

Woking town centre supported two United Reformed Church congregations for a few decades after the denomination was formed by the merger of the Congregational Church and the English Presbyterian Church in 1972. Only one survives, though: it occupies the building which originally opened in 1952 as St Andrew's Presbyterian Church on White Rose Lane. The town's original Congregational chapel, Mount Hermon Congregational Church, opened in 1899 and was extended in the 1950s and 1960s. It later became York Road United Reformed Church but closed in January 2005, was deregistered accordingly in April 2005 and has been demolished (planning permission for this was granted in November 2007). There was also a small church in West Byfleet.

There are no surviving Plymouth Brethren meeting rooms in the borough, but Brethren groups have a long history locally: the Victoria County History recorded "a meeting-place" in 1911. The former Strict Baptist chapel at Horsell Common was bought by a member of the Brethren in 1963 and was used by them until its demolition in the 1980s. Also in Horsell, the Meadway Room on Meadway Drive was built in 1957 and was used for worship until 2010, when the reduced congregation moved to a large new Gospel Hall at Artington near Guildford. Planning permission for its demolition was granted in 2011. A small meeting room registered on Goldsworth Road in central Woking in the 1980s has been acquired by a Muslim community group. There was also a meeting room on Station Road in West Byfleet.

Muslims, Buddhists and members of the Eastern Orthodox Church also have their own places of worship in the borough. Shah Jahan Mosque in the Maybury area was "the centre of Islam in this country for several years" after it opened in 1889; it was also the first mosque of the modern era in Western Europe and the first purpose-built mosque in Britain. It was home to the Woking Muslim Mission, which published the Islamic Review for many years. Gottlieb Wilhelm Leitner founded and built it, but after his death in 1899 it remained closed until 1912. Thai Buddhist adherents of the Dhammakaya Movement UK have established a temple in the former chapel of the Surrey County Asylum (latterly known as Brookwood Hospital), while a congregation of Eastern Orthodox Christians have since 1982 worshipped at one of the former Anglican cemetery chapels in Brookwood Cemetery.

== Religious affiliation ==
According to the United Kingdom Census 2011, 99,198 people lived in the borough of Woking. Of these, 58.8% identified themselves as Christian, 7.4% were Muslim, 2% were Hindu, 0.7% were Buddhist, 0.2% were Jewish, 0.2% were Sikh, 0.3% followed another religion, 23.1% claimed no religious affiliation and 7.3% did not state their religion. The proportion of Christians was lower than the 59.8% recorded in England as a whole; the proportion of people with no religious affiliation was significantly lower (the national figure was 27.7%); and Sikhism and other religions also had a lower proportion of adherents than England as a whole. The proportions of Woking residents identifying as Jewish or not stating their religion were broadly in line with the national figures. Buddhism and Hinduism were followed by a greater proportion of people than in England as a whole—the respective national figures were 0.5% and 1.1%—but the most significant difference from the national picture was the much higher percentage of residents identifying as Muslim. With more than 7,300 adherents of Islam, Woking borough has a percentage of 7.4% against the national figure of 2.3%.

== Administration ==
=== Anglican churches ===
The 18 Anglican churches in the borough are administered by the Deanery of Woking. This is part of the Diocese of Guildford, whose seat is Guildford Cathedral. Also part of the deanery are the churches at Pirbright, Ripley, Send and Wisley, all of which are in the neighbouring Borough of Guildford. The official names of the parishes within Woking borough, some of which cover more than one church, are Byfleet; Goldsworth Park; Horsell; Knaphill with Brookwood; West Byfleet; Wisley with Pyrford (covering the two churches in Pyrford); Woking Christ Church; Woking St John; Woking St Mary of Bethany; Woking St Paul; Woking St Peter; and Woodham.

=== Roman Catholic churches ===
Woking borough has four Roman Catholic churches—St Edward the Confessor's Church at Sutton Place, St Dunstan's Church southeast of Woking town centre, St Hugh of Lincoln's at Knaphill and Our Lady Help of Christians at West Byfleet. St Edward the Confessor's is part of Guildford Deanery, and the other three are administered by Woking Deanery. These are two of 13 deaneries in the Roman Catholic Diocese of Arundel and Brighton, whose cathedral is at Arundel in West Sussex.

=== Other denominations ===
Knaphill Baptist Church and the New Life Baptist Church at Old Woking are part of the Guildford Network of the South Eastern Baptist Association. Providence Chapel in Knaphill maintains links with GraceNet UK, an association of Reformed Evangelical Christian churches and organisations. The seven-church Woking and Walton-on-Thames Methodist Circuit administers the Methodist churches at Byfleet and Knaphill, Trinity Methodist Church in Woking town centre and the shared Anglican/Methodist church of St Michael's on the Sheerwater estate. Woking United Reformed Church is part of the Wessex Synod, one of that denomination's 13 synods in the United Kingdom. Horsell Evangelical Church is a member of two Evangelical groups: the Fellowship of Independent Evangelical Churches (FIEC), a pastoral and administrative network of about 500 churches with an evangelical outlook, and Affinity (formerly the British Evangelical Council), a network of conservative Evangelical congregations throughout Great Britain. Providence Chapel at Knaphill is also a member of Affinity.

== Listed status ==
Grade	Criteria
Grade I	Buildings of exceptional interest, sometimes considered to be internationally important.
Grade II*	Particularly important buildings of more than special interest.
Grade II	Buildings of national importance and special interest.

== Current places of worship ==
Current places of worship
Name	Image	Location	Denomination/ Affiliation	Grade	Notes	Refs
St Mary the Virgin's Church (More images)		Byfleet; 51.3329°N 0.4758°W	Anglican	I	The whole church—consisting of 19 1/2-foot (5.9 m) chancel, 42 5/6-foot (13.1 m) nave, single aisle, porch and bell-cot—was rebuilt c. 1290 in "a very simple late Early English [Gothic]", unusual among Surrey churches. The walls are of flint and puddingstone. The belfry, supported by a simple wooden structure, contains three bells dated 1853. Henry Woodyer added a transept in 1864.	
St Nicholas' Church (More images)		Pyrford; 51.3137°N 0.5093°W	Anglican	I	T.G. Jackson's "exceptionally sensitive" restoration of 1869 did little to change the layout and appearance of this mid-12th-century church on a high, sloping site. The building materials are varied, including some rarely used Caen stone. Some medieval wall paintings were discovered in the 19th century, including the Flagellation of Christ and a representation of Prudentius' Psychomachia.	
St Peter's Church (More images)		Old Woking; 51.3016°N 0.5369°W	Anglican	I	Of the Norman building, only the nave walls remain. The chancel was rebuilt in the 13th century, and the base of the heavily buttressed tower dates from then. It was added to in the 14th or 15th century, along with a south aisle. The distinctively crow-stepped gabled porch is of brick. Restoration in 1886 altered the interior and added a vestry.	
St Mary the Virgin's Church (More images)		Horsell; 51.3228°N 0.5704°W	Anglican	II*	W.F. Unsworth (who designed Christ Church in Woking town centre and the church at Woodham) restored this village church in 1890, removing most of the earlier detail. Only fragmentary 14th-century work remains, and the diagonal-buttressed tower and arcade to the south aisle are 15th-century. The tower resembles that at nearby Worplesdon church. A chapel existed at Horsell long before 1258, when the advowson passed from the ancient monastery of Westminster to Newark Priory.	
All Saints Church (More images)		Woodham; 51.3346°N 0.5433°W	Anglican	II	W.F. Unsworth's "[architecturally] competent but joyless" and expensively built church for this wealthy suburban area dates from 1893. It was designed to resemble an ancient Surrey chapel: there are many pseudo-Norman features, much tile-hanging and rubble walls. The chancel has a side chapel with mosaic tiling, dating from a major extension in 1906 which also gave the church a larger nave, vestry and spire.	
Christ Church (More images)		Woking; 51.3199°N 0.5581°W	Anglican	II	This town-centre church was designed by W.F. Unsworth in the Gothic Revival style in vivid red brick. There are two copper spires and an apse to the chancel. The spacious interior has a large king post roof, aisles to each side of the nave and a modern vestry and west-end narthex with a large rose window. The church was originally a chapel of ease to St John the Baptist's Church. The first services were held in the back room of a shop, then a tin tabernacle was erected on a site chosen in 1861. The new church's foundation stone was laid on 10 November 1887; construction cost £8,000, and it was still unfinished when consecrated on 1 January 1889.	
St John the Baptist's Church (More images)		West Byfleet; 51.3383°N 0.5026°W	Anglican	II	In 1911 it was recorded that there was an "iron chapel of ease at Byfleet Corner", served from St Mary's Church at Byfleet. Construction of the permanent church was already underway then: it started in 1910 and was completed two years later to a Gothic Revival design by W. D. Caroe. As at Woodham, there was "an attempt to evoke the Surrey style". The cruciform church has flint and stone walls.	
St Mary of Bethany Church (More images)		Mount Hermon; 51.3111°N 0.568°W	Anglican	II	Another W. D. Caroe church, this dates from 1907 and shows the influence of Edwin Lutyens in its intricately detailed brickwork and tiling. Broadly Tudor Gothic Revival in style, it presents a wide west front to the street, with a prominent window with panelled tracery. There is no tower or spire—just a small bell-turret. The arched windows have tiled voussoirs.	
All Souls Church (More images)		Sutton Green; 51.2845°N 0.5603°W	Anglican	–	A tin tabernacle in this village south of Woking served as a mission chapel from the 1880s until the present church was built in 1921 to commemorate the 28 residents who died in military service in World War I. It was consecrated in March 1922, and an extension was added later. The tin tabernacle survived for many years as the village hall, but no longer stands. All Souls is one of three churches in the parish of St Peter's Church, Old Woking.	
Church of the Good Shepherd (More images)		Pyrford; 51.3254°N 0.5094°W	Anglican	–	This church, designed by David Evelyn Nye in 1964, serves the centre of Pyrford village (St Nicholas' Church is some way to the south). Land was bought in 1936, but the first moves to build a church there came 26 years later. An extension was built in 2000 to commemorate the Millennium. There is much modern stained glass, including a west window by Margaret Traherne who designed glass at Coventry Cathedral. The maximum capacity is over 600.	
Emmanuel Church (More images)		Mayford; 51.2977°N 0.5882°W	Anglican	–	St John the Baptist's Church in the St John's area founded this village church, which is still a daughter church within that parish. Services took place in a barn from the early 20th century, then a Mrs Hervey donated some land in 1905 for the construction of a church. The mission hall, as it was originally known, opened on 4 October 1905 and cost £233.8s.1d. Photographs show a wooden building with a tiled roof, a gable end and a projecting bell-cot. A later name was Emmanuel Chapel. The present church opened on the same site in 1992.	
Holy Trinity Church (More images)		Knaphill; 51.3163°N 0.6247°W	Anglican	–	Knaphill's Anglican church was built in 1907 for £4,000 and consecrated on 25 September of that year. It superseded a tin tabernacle (also dedicated to the Holy Trinity) which was built in 1885 when the area was known as Knapp Hill. The architect was J.H. Ball, whose plans dated from 1893, and the red-brick design (using the products of Knaphill Brickworks) has a Romanesque Revival flavour. Princess Helena of Waldeck and Pyrmont, the Duchess of Albany, laid the foundation stone on 23 March 1907; her visit attracted great interest as she travelled to Knaphill from Woking railway station by carriage. The church was not registered for marriages until 1941 (its mother church St John the Baptist's was used instead) and was only parished in 1967.	
St Andrew's Church (More images)		Goldsworth Park; 51.3188°N 0.5907°W	Anglican	–	Built in 1988 to a design by architect Robert Potter, this church (one of five founded by St John the Baptist's Church in the St John's area of Woking) serves the Goldsworth Park housing estate.	
St John the Baptist's Church (More images)		St John's; 51.3163°N 0.6247°W	Anglican	–	The first Anglican church built in Woking since the ancient parish church of St Peter was designed by George Gilbert Scott and W.B. Moffatt in 1842; it was one of Scott's first churches. The vicar of Woking provided £1,500 for its construction. It served the new residential area (now known as St John's) which developed northwest of Old Woking and south of the South West Main Line, alongside the Basingstoke Canal. Originally aisleless, side aisles were built in 1879–83. The church is Early English Gothic Revival in style and is of ragstone and Bath stone. It was parished in 1884.	
St Mark's Church (More images)		Westfield; 51.3004°N 0.5611°W	Anglican	–	In 1849, the vicar of St Peter's Church decided to build a church school in the Westfield area of the parish. The building became a place of worship (under the name The Mission) in 1924, and took its present dedication in 1970. Much restoration work has taken place since then. The church is still part of the parish of St Peter's Church along with All Souls Church at Sutton Green.	
St Paul's Church (More images)		Maybury; 51.3222°N 0.5427°W	Anglican	–	This was originally a chapel of ease to Christ Church in the town centre. It was built in 1895, six years after that church, principally of red brick but with some Bath stonework.	
St Saviour's Church (More images)		Brookwood; 51.3046°N 0.6374°W	Anglican	–	Architect J.H. Ball, who designed the sister church of Holy Trinity, Knaphill two years earlier, was responsible for this "neat church with Lutyenseque details" in 1909 (the first stone was laid on 21 July of that year). It was one of five churches founded by St John the Baptist's Church at St John's. The first church in the village was erected in 1897 by St John's vicar Rev. J.M. Harris: he bought land on Connaught Road and put up a wood-panelled tin tabernacle. This was moved backwards on rollers to make way for the new church, and served as the church hall until the 1960s.	
St Michael's Church (More images)		Sheerwater; 51.3339°N 0.5275°W	Anglican/Methodist	–	Sheerwater is a London overspill estate designated by London County Council in the 1950s. Temporary churches for Roman Catholics, Anglicans and Methodists were provided; the Catholic church later closed down, but the other two denominations joined forces to build a permanent shared church. It was designed by Arthur Saunders and (in accordance with the Marriage Act 1949) was registered for marriages in January 1976, at which point the registration of the former Methodist chapel on Blackmore Crescent (granted in 1959) was cancelled. St Michael's has been threatened with demolition because of a proposed reconstruction of the Sheerwater estate.	
St Edward the Confessor's Church (More images)		Sutton Place; 51.2745°N 0.5604°W	Roman Catholic	II	Sutton Place served as "the rendezvous for Surrey Catholics" for much of the 19th century; it was home to the Weston family who maintained the Catholic faith throughout the post-Reformation period. A chapel in the house was superseded by Charles Alban Buckler's Early English Gothic Revival flint and stone church in the grounds of the house, which was built by James Harris. It was registered for marriages in November 1876.	
Church of Our Lady Help of Christians (More images)		West Byfleet; 51.3384°N 0.5067°W	Roman Catholic	–	A temporary timber chapel served by a Belgian priest opened in 1917 (the area was home to many Belgian refugees at this time). It became a chapel of ease to Woking and was registered for marriages in April 1927; then in 1935 the church was separately parished and was given its own resident priest. A new building was needed because the congregation was growing, and construction on the present church started in December 1955. It was opened and registered in October 1956.	
St Dunstan's Church (More images)		Maybury; 51.3192°N 0.5452°W	Roman Catholic	–	A tin tabernacle served from St Edward the Confessor's Church was erected in central Woking in 1899. Work began on a permanent in 1924, and the "tasteful church ... of some quality" (a Perpendicular Gothic Revival building by Joseph Goldie and G.R. Gilbertson Topham) opened in 1927. This was in turn replaced by the present church, which was registered for marriages in August 2008.	
St Hugh of Lincoln's Church (More images)		Knaphill; 51.318°N 0.6137°W	Roman Catholic	–	The first church was built in 1908 by its priest, Fr Henry Drage, but had to close when he moved to St Edward the Confessor's Church at Sutton Place. As the population grew, it reopened in 1946 and was served from Woking, then was allocated its own priest and parish. It was too small, though, so services were held additionally at Brookwood Hospital, the Inkerman Barracks and the British Legion Hall until a church hall was built in the 1960s: this was used for services until a new permanent church was erected in 1971. It was registered for worship and marriages in February of that year.	
Courtenay Free Church		Maybury; 51.3254°N 0.5435°W	Evangelical	–	The original Courtenay Free Church was a non-denominational mission hall built in 1906 on a site at the junction of Omega Road and Courtenay Road which now has residential buildings on it. This chapel, which was not registered for marriages until May 1945, was replaced in 1969 by the present building nearby.	
Father's House Woking (More images)		Woking; 51.3215°N 0.5519°W	Evangelical	–	A "Brethren Gospel Hall" was the only building on Portugal Road in 1894, a time when this part of Woking was being built up. It was registered for marriages between 1945 and 1977, at which time it was replaced by the present building. The occupants were denominationally independent but were part of the Partnership UK group of unaffiliated churches. The church was taken over in 2018 by its present congregation, a Charismatic Evangelical group called Potter's House Christian Fellowship, which was planted out of a similar fellowship in Shepherd's Bush in London.	
Horsell Evangelical Church		Horsell; 51.3234°N 0.5752°W	Evangelical	–	Rebecca Watney, daughter of James Watney (founder of Watney & Co. Brewery), moved to Maybury in 1895. She had already founded a non-denominational mission church in the family's home town of Croydon, and she bought land for a mission chapel in Horsell in the late 1890s. She paid for two houses to be built, one of which was used for services from c. 1896; then a tin tabernacle was erected behind them and was used from January 1900. It survived until its demolition in 1983, by which time the present building was already under construction: it was completed 12 months later and was registered in November 1984.	
Welcome Church (More images)		Woking; 51.3176°N 0.5641°W	Evangelical	–	Welcome Church, known as The Coign Church until May 2018, traces its roots to a house church founded by Addlestone Baptist Chapel but which became independent in 1884. A chapel was then built on Percy Street, followed by a larger replacement on Goldsworth Road. For many years it was known as Woking Baptist Church, but rapid growth from the 1960s prompted the construction of larger replacement church in Woking town centre. This was registered for worship in September 1977 and for marriages the following month. The church now identifies itself as independent Evangelical and is associated with the Commission branch of the wider Newfrontiers movement. A new building which enables larger congregations to attend was opened on 19 January 2020. The use of backlit coloured glass elements in a projection on the roof is a distinctive feature of the building, which otherwise resembles the 1977 church (pictured).	
Byfleet Methodist Church (More images)		Byfleet; 51.3381°N 0.478°W	Methodist	–	Byfleet's original Wesleyan chapel was registered for worship between December 1920 and April 1928. The present church on Rectory Lane was registered in its place in March 1933.	
Knaphill Methodist Church (More images)		Knaphill; 51.3177°N 0.6176°W	Methodist	–	The Guildford Wesleyan Circuit sent preachers to hold open-air services on the heathland around Knaphill. Worship then moved to rooms at the Royal Standard Inn and the Anchor Hotel until land was bought in 1865 for £20 and architect W.W. Pocock of London designed a 240-capacity chapel, which opened in February 1867. It was extended in 1877 and refurbished in 1917, but by the 1930s it was structurally unsound, so trustee Frank Derry (also a benefactor of Byfleet Methodist Church) helped to pay for a replacement—a large red-brick Art Deco-style building with extensive oak panelling and furnishings. The congregation had also been raising funds since 1912. It was finished in October 1935, six months after the old chapel was demolished, and opened on 6 November 1935 at a cost of £4,000. Its marriage registration dates from April 1935.	
Trinity Methodist Church (More images)		Woking; 51.3223°N 0.5598°W	Methodist	–	Described by Nikolaus Pevsner as "excellently planned", this octagonal church designed by E.D. Mills & Partners replaced the 1904 chapel in the town centre. The low-pitched roof rises to a central lantern, and the side walls have large mullioned windows reaching almost to ground level in places. The entrance is at the west end and has modern stained glass above it. The opening ceremony was held on 12 June 1965, three years after the foundation stone was laid.	
Knaphill Baptist Church (More images)		Knaphill; 51.3174°N 0.6206°W	Baptist	–	The brick-built chapel dates from 1882 and was originally called Hope Chapel. It was founded by horticulturist Robert Lloyd who had moved from Rugby, Warwickshire to be head gardener at the Surrey County Asylum in Brookwood; he belonged to the Churches of Christ movement, and the cost of £370 was met by a loan from Robert Black of Chelsea who had founded many Churches of Christ chapels in London. It was registered for marriages in January 1892, and the church was free from debt in 1897.	
New Life Church (More images)		Old Woking; 51.3028°N 0.5513°W	Baptist	–	Woking Baptist Church in Percy Street, forerunner of the present Welcome Church, founded Kingfield Baptist Church in 1929 as a church plant. The original buildings were erected in early 1930 and the church opened on 5 March 1930. It was administered by Woking Baptist Church until 1956, and now occupies a new building.	
Kingdom Hall (More images)		Brookwood; 51.3048°N 0.6412°W	Jehovah's Witnesses	–	Brookwood originally had two places of worship: St Saviour's Church and a Primitive Methodist chapel—a Gothic Revival building originally with a spire. After the latter closed, it was taken over by a congregation of Jehovah's Witnesses, converted into a Kingdom Hall and registered accordingly in January 1977. It has since been demolished and replaced with a purpose-built hall on the same site, which serves the Woking, North and Woking, South Congregations of Jehovah's Witnesses.	
Kingdom Hall (More images)		Byfleet; 51.3384°N 0.4712°W	Jehovah's Witnesses	–	This Kingdom Hall serves the Byfleet Congregation of Jehovah's Witnesses. It was registered for worship in November 1971 and for marriages in May 1975.	
Calvary Church		Woking; 51.314°N 0.5742°W	Assemblies of God	–	Under the name Woking Assembly of God, this house was registered for worship in February 1969 and for marriages in August 1971. Worship also takes place at Goldsworth Primary School. The link with the Assemblies of God denomination continues.	
Wat Phra Dhammakaya London (More images)		Knaphill; 51.3139°N 0.6171°W	Buddhist	–	Also known as Woking Buddhist Temple, this is one of 15 Thai Buddhist temples in England and is the headquarters of the Dhammakaya Movement UK. It occupies the former chapel of Brookwood Hospital, formerly one of Surrey's main psychiatric hospitals, which closed in 1994. The former mortuary now houses the temple's monks. After internal renovation of the derelict chapel, it was opened in its new form in 2004.	
First Church of Christ, Scientist, Woking (More images)		Woking; 51.3154°N 0.554°W	Christian Scientist	–	Based in Heathside Avenue, this is a branch church of the Mother Church in Boston, Massachusetts. There are two services weekly and a Sunday school. A Christian Science Reading Room is part of the complex of buildings. The church was registered for worship in March 1953.	
St Edward the Martyr's Orthodox Church (More images)		Brookwood; 51.2995°N 0.6241°W	Eastern Orthodox	–	The relics of Edward the Martyr (962–978) were enshrined in this former cemetery chapel in September 1984 after being discovered in 1931. The Eastern Orthodox Church established a monastic community in nearby buildings, and the chapel (built c. 1909 to the design of Cyril Tubbs and Arthur Messer) was registered as a place of worship in February 1990 for the Saint Edward Brotherhood and for a wider parish of Eastern Orthodox Christians.	
Shah Jahan Mosque (More images)		Maybury; 51.3226°N 0.5446°W	Muslim	I	Oriental scholar Gottlieb Wilhelm Leitner from Budapest founded Britain's first mosque in 1889 and named it after its main financial donor, Sultan Shah Jahan, Begum of Bhopal. Architect W. Chambers was commissioned, and he was responsible for the building itself—an "extraordinarily dignified" and opulent Indo-Saracenic Bargate and Bath stone box topped by an onion dome with a gilded crescent. He did not however design the elaborate mosaic pavement and courtyard outside, which included a reservoir for worshippers to wash in: by this time a dispute had arisen between Chambers and Leitner, leading the former to remark "we wish [it] had been built at Jericho or some place distant enough never to have troubled us". After a period of closure the mosque reopened in 1912 and was registered for marriages in December 1920.	
Word of Life Church		Woking; 51.3224°N 0.5508°W	Pentecostal	–	Previously on this site stood the Marlborough Road Meeting Room, whose marriage registration was cancelled in April 1986. It was recorded as a Brethren meeting room in 1963. The present church originated in the 1970s and also holds worship services on the Sheerwater estate.	
Friends Meeting House		Woking; 51.3174°N 0.5444°W	Quaker	–	The community was formed in 1947 and met in the Woking YMCA Hall. Although a permanent place of worship was proposed in 1958, nothing happened until 1965, when a house on Park Road was bought for £8,000. A further £2,000 of alterations converted it into a ground-floor meeting room capable of holding 60 worshippers, a classroom and a flat above. It was first used for worship in 1966 and was registered accordingly in May of that year.	
Salvation Army Hall (More images)		Horsell; 51.3235°N 0.5819°W	Salvation Army	–	This is the third Salvation Army place of worship in Woking. The first citadel was erected in 1910 at a cost of £1,528 on the corner of Chertsey Road and Clarence Avenue. The town-centre redevelopment scheme led to the loss of this site to a supermarket and a multi-storey car park, and a replacement building opened in 1972 at the junction of Stanley Road and Walton Road. This has itself been demolished and redeveloped.	
Church of the Holy Cross (More images)		Maybury; 51.3202°N 0.5377°W	Society of St. Pius X	II*	St Peter's Anglican Convent was built in 1885, and John Loughborough Pearson added the "marvellous Byzantine-style chapel" in 1897–1901. The convent has now been converted into housing, but the chapel survives in religious use in the ownership of the Society of St. Pius X. It has been used by its new owners since May 1996 and is described as "the Society's main church for South London".	
Woking and District Spiritualist Church (More images)		Woking; 51.3214°N 0.5521°W	Spiritualist	–	This was registered for worship and marriages in April 1970, superseding an earlier church of the same name on Bath Road which dated from 1938.	
Providence Baptist Church (More images)		Knaphill; 51.3197°N 0.6075°W	Strict Baptist	–	Worship has taken place on this site on Robin Hood Road for more than 140 years, but the church in its present form was founded in 1933 and registered for marriages in January 1960. In 1998 some buildings were demolished and replaced by the present multi-purpose church and hall. The cause was founded by the pastor of the Horsell Common Strict Baptist Chapel, Edward Joy, some of whose congregation were farmers living at "Knapp Hill" who needed a place of worship closer to their homes. The chapel passed through various owners until the church was reconstituted by a pastor from Aldershot.	
Woking United Reformed Church (More images)		Woking; 51.3159°N 0.5555°W	United Reformed Church	–	Presbyterians began to meet in 1941, but only in 1952 was their permanent church built. It was dedicated to Saint Andrew and was registered for marriages under that name in April 1953, a year after its worship certification was granted. The United Reformed Church denomination was formed in 1972, and in 2005 members of the York Road church (formerly Congregational) joined St Andrew's, which was then renamed Woking United Reformed Church.	
Woking Vineyard Church		Woking; 51.3186°N 0.5581°W	Vineyard Movement	–	Previously based at the Old Woking Community Centre (pictured) in the Kingfield suburb, this church (part of the Vineyard Movement) now meets at The Lighthouse near Woking railway station. As well as a place of worship, this acts as a centre for the local community, offering services such as a food and clothes bank, training and debt counselling.	

== Former places of worship ==
Former places of worship
Name	Image	Location	Denomination/ Affiliation	Grade	Notes	Refs
St Thomas's Mission Church		Littlewick, Knaphill; 51.327°N 0.6023°W	Anglican	–	Standing in the middle of a wood north of Knaphill and close to Horsell Common, this wooden church dates from 1901 and was marked on maps as a mission church serving the nearby cottages. It became a nursery school in 1968.	
Anthonys Baptist Chapel		Anthonys, Horsell Common; 51.3391°N 0.5431°W	Baptist	–	The pastor of the Baptist chapel in Woking town centre in 1887 was Rev E.W. Tarbox. He started house meetings in the isolated hamlet of Anthonys, and a resident soon allowed a 60-capacity mission chapel to be built on his land. Chapel Cottage survives in use as a house, but it was quickly superseded as a place of worship by the new church on the other side of the Chertsey Road.	
Anthonys Baptist Church		Anthonys, Horsell Common; 51.3401°N 0.5436°W	Baptist	–	A permanent chapel for Nonconformists in the Anthonys area was built in 1900–01. The "pretty and convenient brick building" had a gabled façade could hold 120 worshippers and stood next to the post office. All Saints Church at Woodham, which opened in 1893, gradually had an effect on the congregation as some gravitated towards that church, but the chapel remained open until the 1980s when it was sold for residential conversion. The "architect and builder" was recorded as F.J. Bridger.	
Goldsworth Road Meeting Room		Woking; 51.3171°N 0.5692°W	Plymouth Brethren	–	Brethren have a long history in the Woking area: the Victoria County History of Surrey (1911) records "a meeting-place of the Plymouth Brethren" in Woking parish. A new meeting room was built on Goldsworth Road near the town centre and was registered in February 1986, but it has since closed and become the Al-Asr Educational and Community Centre, having passed into the ownership of the local Muslim community.	
Mayford Baptist Chapel		Mayford; 51.2945°N 0.5692°W	Baptist	–	This "picturesque little chapel" on the road between Woking and Guildford could trace its history as a Baptist place of worship back to 1824. The cause faltered, even disbanding between 1866 and 1867, before coming under the stewardship of the Strict Baptist chapel at Guildford. Its ownership was secured in 1890 when it was placed in trust, the leasehold having been bought out. The red-brick and slate building has a gabled façade which shows signs of being extended outwards and upwards. The side elevations have arched windows. The building is now a house; its worship registration was cancelled in August 1987.	
West Byfleet United Reformed Church		West Byfleet; 51.3415°N 0.5029°W	United Reformed Church	–	The Surrey Mission established a Congregational meeting room in the parish of Byfleet in 1858. The cause transferred to a former Plymouth Brethren meeting room near West Byfleet railway station in 1902; this was bought for £1,200, and the church was put under the charge of Weybridge Congregational Church before being transferred to Cobham. It was registered for marriages in June 1903 and was still in use after the Congregational–Presbyterian merger in 1972 formed the United Reformed Church.	

== Bibliography ==
- Blatch, Mervyn (1997). The Churches of Surrey. Chichester: Phillimore & Co. Ltd. ISBN 1-86077-002-9.
- Butler, David M. (1999). The Quaker meeting houses of Britain: Nottinghamshire to Scotland. Vol. 2. Friends Historical Society. ISBN 0-900469-44-7.
- Chambers, Ralph (1952). The Strict Baptist Chapels of England: Surrey and Hampshire. Vol. 1. Thornton Heath: Ralph Chambers.
- Cleal, Edward E.; Crippen, T. G. (1908). The story of Congregationalism in Surrey. London: James Clarke & Co.
- Crosby, Alan (2003) [1982]. A History of Woking. Chichester: Phillimore & Co. Ltd. ISBN 1-86077-262-5.
- Davies, Lyndon (2004). Around Woking. Images of England. Stroud: Tempus Publishing Ltd. ISBN 0-7524-3230-3.
- Facey, Roy A., ed. (1981). International Church Index (Doctrinal). Index Publications. ISBN 0-907578-00-4.
- Farries, Margaret; Lampkin, Mike; Lampkin, Sarah; Taylor, Jane (November 1997). Brookwood Remembered (1st ed.).
- Field, Marion (2014). Woking Through Time. Stroud: Amberley Publishing. ISBN 978-1-4456-2118-0.
- Foster, Mal (2012). Knaphill (All in one Place). Publish Nation. ISBN 978-1-4717-7278-8.
- Hill, Roy (2002) [1990]. The Assemblies Address Book (PDF) (5th ed.). Bristol: Christian Year Publications. ISBN 1-872734-25-1. Archived from the original (PDF) on 19 September 2004.
- Methodist Church of Great Britain (1947). Methodist Church Buildings: Statistical Returns including Seating Accommodation as at July 1st, 1940 (PDF). Manchester: The Department for Chapel Affairs. (Available online in 14 parts; Guide to abbreviations on page 6)
- Nairn, Ian; Pevsner, Nikolaus (1971) [1962]. The Buildings of England: Surrey (2nd ed.). Harmondsworth: Penguin Books. ISBN 0-300-09675-5.
- Polack, Bernard; Whitbourn, John (1999). The Catholic Parish of St Edmund King & Martyr, Godalming, 1899–1999. Farnham: Arrow Press.
- Stell, Christopher (2002). Nonconformist Chapels and Meeting-houses in Eastern England. Swindon: English Heritage. ISBN 1-873592-50-7.
- Stockwell, Arthur H., ed. (1909). The Baptist Churches of Surrey. London: Arthur Stockwell.
- Wakeford, Iain (1985). Woking as it Was. Chichester: Phillimore & Co. Ltd. ISBN 0-85033-597-3.
- Wakeford, Iain (1987) [1983]. Bygone Woking. Chichester: Phillimore & Co. Ltd. ISBN 0-85033-506-X.
- Wakeford, Iain (1999). Knaphill: a Heritage Walks Guide. Old Woking: A.K., H.R and D.A Wakeford.
- Wakeford, Iain (2003). Woking Town Centre: an Illustrated History. Woking: Woking Print & Publicity.
- Whiteman, J.R.; Whiteman, S.E. (n.d.). Victorian Woking: an Account of the Development of the Town and Parish in the Victorian Era. Guildford: Surrey Archaeological Society.
- Wright, Heather (2005). The Methodists of Knaphill: the Story of Knaphill Methodist Church. Knaphill: Knaphill Methodist Church.
