= Daniel Harris =

Daniel, Dan, or Danny Harris may refer to:

- Dan Harris (American football) (fl. 1990s), college football coach and athletic director
- Dan Harris (screenwriter) (born 1979), American screenwriter who co-wrote Superman Returns
- Dan Harris (journalist) (born 1971), American television news correspondent
- Dan Harris (politician) (born 1979), Canadian Member of Parliament
- Daniel Harris (footballer) (born 1982), former Australian rules footballer
- Daniel Harris (cricketer) (born 1979), cricketer for Australian domestic team Southern Redbacks
- Daniel Harris (architect) (c. 1761–1840), civil engineer and architect
- Danny Harris (born 1965), American hurdler
- Danny Harris (rugby) (born 1937), rugby union and rugby league footballer of the 1950s and 1960s Wales (RU), Pontypridd, Cardiff, and Leigh (RL)
- Daniel Harris, a character in the TV series The New Adventures of Old Christine
- Daniel Gibson Harris (1915–2007), British and Canadian naval officer and writer on Swedish naval history
- Daniel J. Harris (c. 1833–1890), founder of Fairhaven, Washington
- Daniel Harris (physiologist) (1883–1981), professor of physiology at the London Hospital Medical College.

== See also ==
- Danielle Harris (born 1977), American actress
