= St John's, Woking =

Suburb of Woking, Surrey

Coordinates: 51.311°N 0.594°W

St Johns: St Johns and Hook Heath
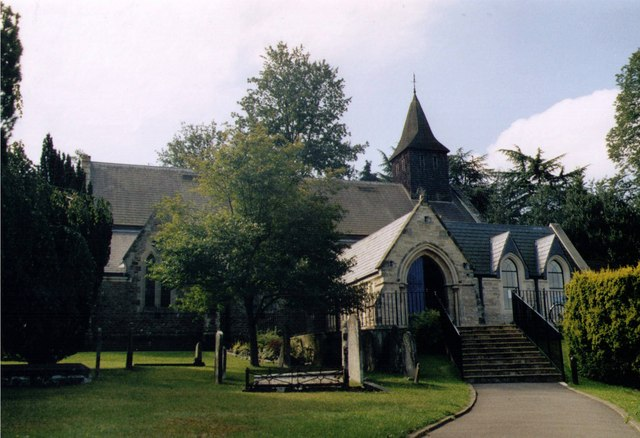
- St John's Church, St Johns

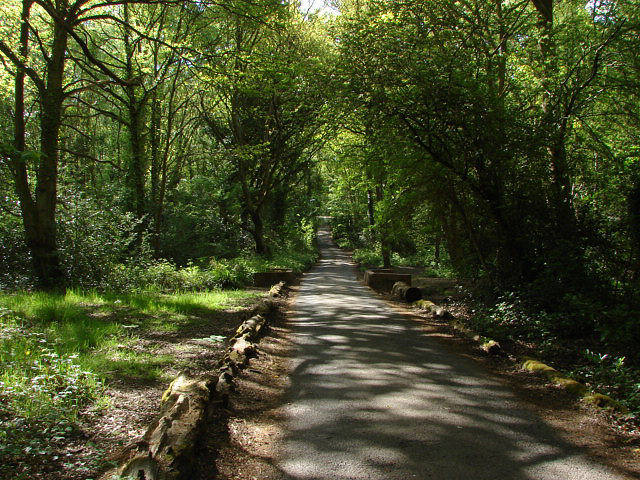
- Thick woodland is mixed with open meadow at St Johns Lye, between St Johns and Hook Heath

- Location within Surrey
- Area: 3.46 km^{2} (1.34 sq mi)
- Population: 4,656 (2011 Census. Ward)
  - Density: 1,346/km^{2} (3,490/sq mi)
- OS grid reference: SU9855
- District: Woking
- Shire county: Surrey
- Region: South East
- Country: England
- Sovereign state: United Kingdom
- Post town: Woking
- Postcode district: GU21
- Dialling code: 01483
- Police: Surrey
- Fire: Surrey
- Ambulance: South East Coast
- UK Parliament: Woking

St Johns and Hook Heath is a suburban ward in Surrey consisting of two settlements founded in the 19th century in the medieval parish of Woking. The two 'villages' have residents' associations and are centred 2.5 km WSW and SW of Woking's town centre in the northwest of the English county – by including such suburbs, Woking is the largest town in the county. The ward in 2011 contained 1,888 homes across its 3.46 square kilometres (1.34 sq mi).

== St Johns ==
=== History ===
The village is elongated along the south of the Basingstoke Canal (completed in 1794), providing boat navigation and a quieter alternative for pedestrians and cyclists to access to the town centre than its various suburban streets. St Johns formed towards the end of Goldsworth Road leading from what was becoming gradually a town centre. It dates largely from the 19th century, when housing first began to be constructed to accommodate workers employed at the local brickworks.

The village gained its name from the Church of England St John the Baptist's church, built here in 1842 from designs prepared by Sir George Gilbert Scott. The church houses a notable organ, described in the National Pipe Organ Register.

A narrow majority of shops and homes exhibit late Victorian to Edwardian architecture, styles which have been promoted in new buildings in and around its conservation area.

=== Amenities ===
Economic amenities

Today the village is home to a mixture of shops and businesses which include a pharmacy, a small supermarket, restaurants, and office premises. The village pub the Rowbarge, built in the 1700’s for workers during the canal construction still serves the village and visitors alike.

Informal social and leisure amenities.

Wildlife is present on the canal and at St Johns Lye – a public open space with a football ground, areas set aside for habitat, a rolling elevated landscape, and other outdoor leisure use.

Organised social and leisure groups

The sole church, mentioned in history, is an active religious group and the dedication of the building gives rise to the name of the settlement.

Scout, guides, a residents' association providing voluntary work, the Women's Institute, a floral art group and the 'Churchill Tennis Club' operate in St Johns.

Baroness Anelay of St Johns is a notable member of the Village Hall facilities provision group for St John's Memorial Hall which is in the centre of the village.

Schools

- A county secondary school is 500m west of St Johns western border, The Winston Churchill School

The following primary schools are in St Johns:

- Hermitage School
- St Hugh of Lincoln Catholic Primary School
- St John's Primary School

== Hook Heath ==
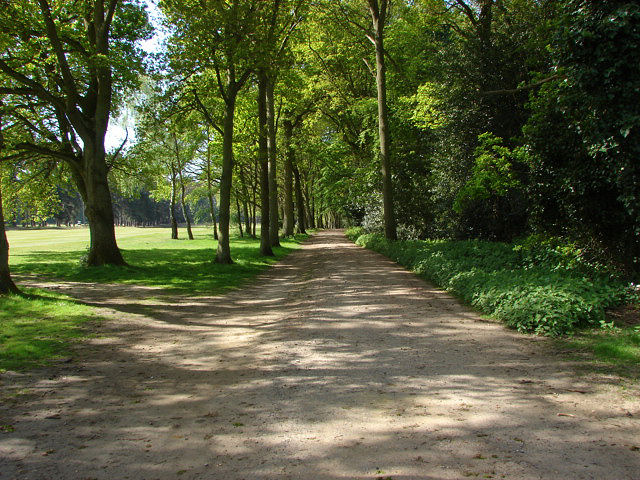
Woking or Hook Heath Golf Course

=== History ===
The oldest building is The Old Cottage, a 16th century cottage with much of its original core intact. In the ward as a whole no other buildings from the two centuries after this exist. No church is in the suburb of Hook Heath. Clay in the east rises into heath of the Bagshot Formation; a town-side residential hill (other than Fisher's Hill by the south of Woking Golf Club) is named Wych Hill and has a number of streets named after it as well as all the commerce apart from the golf club.

Hook Heath adjoins the large St Johns Lye open space, the South West Main Line being the borderline and one road and a footpath connects the two villages. Hook Heath has two roads connecting it to the almost equally elevated district of Woking known as Mount Hermon, passing over and under the Portsmouth Direct Line. The line branches off southwards from the other main line next to some homes of Wych Hill set above the junction in a cutting.

Two large Edwardian homes in tall, ornate architecture in the most rural part of the village are:

- Fisher's Hill House (completed 1901) (by Lutyens) (for Rt Hon Gerald Balfour).
- Gorse Hill (completed 1910) (by E. P. Warren)

These are styles which have been imitated across the settlement which slopes up to Fisher's Hill – a conservation area which is a part-developed, part-golf course sub-locality of the neighbourhood. In 1911 also living in the rural hamlet were Alfred Lyttelton (Lib. U.), Secretary of State for the Colonies (1903–1905) and the Duke of Sutherland.

=== Amenities ===
Economic amenities

The village has in common with St Johns one half of the local Renault dealership and car servicing centre, a large inn (the Star) which closed in 2014 and has been redeveloped into a small supermarket, a national chain of hairdressers and a small number of private care homes.

Social and leisure amenities.

Woking Golf Club with woodland, heath and 18 holes of golf, occupies much of the west of Hook Heath and has large lakeside pavilion golf club restaurant. The clubhouse venue has bar and shop facilities.

Gorse Hill is today an air-conditioned Edwardian mansion, at the end of Mile Path, by the Golf Course, a partial residential road, partial driveway, offering residential management training and meeting and conference facilities here run by the De Vere Venues group.

Hook Heath has a residents' association providing seasonal voluntary work in and with the community.

== Demography ==
At the last census in 2011, the proportion of households in St Johns and Hook Heath who owned their home outright was 8.2% above the borough average. The proportion who owned their home with a loan was 0.5% greater than borough average. The borough figures were in turn slightly greater than the national average. The figures showed overall a lower proportion than average of rented residential property and of social housing in St Johns and Hook Heath than either of the two averages however close to the average in Surrey.

2011 Census Key Statistics
Output area	Population	Households	% Owned outright	% Owned with a loan	hectares
St Johns and Hook Heath (ward)	3,192	1,888	39.8	39.4	346

== Local government ==
At Surrey County Council, one of the 81 representatives represents the area within the Woking West division.

At Woking Borough Council most wards of the borough are small and deemed appropriate to be represented under the current constitution of councillors by one or two councillors, as is the case for St John's and Hook Heath.

Surrey County Councillor
Election	Member	Electoral Division
2011	Linda Kemeny	Woking South West

Woking Borough Councillors
Election	Member	Ward
2010	John Kingsbury	St Johns and Hook Heath
2011	Graham Cundy	St Johns and Hook Heath

== Neighbouring areas ==
Neighbouring suburbs or villages of both villages are Goldsworth Park and Mount Hermon. Two neighbours to the north of the canal are outlying Horsell and Knaphill, which adjoin the canal's towpath and have marginally more retail and commerce.

A neighbour to Hook Heath is Mayford from which it is separated by a buffer of garden nurseries and agricultural fields. The borough council groups voluntary and leisure organisations into a Mount Hermon, St. Johns, Hook Heath, Mayford and Sutton Green neighbourhood' of Woking.
