= G. Spencer-Brown =

English Mathematician (1923-2016)

- Born: George Spencer-Brown; 2 April 1923; Grimsby, Lincolnshire, England
- Died: 25 August 2016 (aged 93); Market Lavington, Wiltshire, England
- Education: Trinity College, Cambridge
- Occupation: Mathematician

George Spencer-Brown (2 April 1923 – 25 August 2016) was an English polymath best known as the author of the 1969 book Laws of Form, a study of mathematics and philosophy. He described himself as a "mathematician, consulting engineer, psychologist, educational consultant and practitioner, consulting psychotherapist, author, and poet".

== Early life and education ==
Born in Grimsby, Lincolnshire, England, Spencer-Brown attended Mill Hill School (1936-41). In 1940 he passed the First M.B., a preliminary scientific exam for medical students at the London Hospital Medical College (now part of Barts and The London School of Medicine and Dentistry). He worked there with James Dixon Boyd on experiments in the special senses, and with Daniel Harris with experiments on hypnosis. He joined the Royal Navy as a telegraphist in 1943 and having passed a practical exam with the highest recorded score in 1944 he transferred to the Electrical Branch to become a Radio Mechanic (Wireless). He conducted successful trials in the use of hypnosis for dentistry at HMS Collingwood and left the Navy with the rank of lieutenant in 1947.

He then became a member of Trinity College, Cambridge, earning Honours in Philosophy (1950) and Psychology (1951), and where he met Bertrand Russell. In 1952 he gained a fellowship at Christ Church, Oxford where he taught until 1958. He received M.A. degrees in 1954 from both Oxford and Cambridge. However although his doctoral thesis Probability and Scientific Inference (written under the supervision of William Kneale) was published as a book in 1957, he never went through the formal process of gaining a PhD.

== Working for Mullard ==
Whilst at Cambridge University Spencer-Brown had met Ivan Idelson: they both represented Cambridge University in the 1948 Oxford vs Cambridge varsity chess match. Later when he found himself unprepared to cope with what to do next, after his fellowship at Christ Church came to a close, he contacted Idelson, who put him up for a year. Idelson, who was working for Mullard Equipment Limited, also found him a job a year later, when he said that he was interested in a job there.

== Kingsley Hall ==
During the 1960s, he became a disciple of the innovative Scottish psychiatrist R. D. Laing, frequently cited in Laws of Form. In 1964, on Bertrand Russell's recommendation, he became a lecturer in formal mathematics at the University of London. From 1969 onward, he was affiliated with the Department of Pure Mathematics and Mathematical Statistics at the University of Cambridge. In the 1970s and 1980s, he was visiting professor at the University of Western Australia, Stanford University, and at the University of Maryland, College Park.

=== Laws of Form ===
Laws of Form, at once a work of mathematics and of philosophy, emerged from work in electronic engineering Spencer-Brown did around 1960, and from lectures on mathematical logic he later gave under the auspices of the University of London's extension program. First published in 1969, it has never been out of print. Spencer-Brown referred to the mathematical system of Laws of Form as the "primary algebra" and the "calculus of indications"; others have termed it "boundary algebra". The primary algebra is essentially an elegant minimalist notation for the two-element Boolean algebra.

One core aspect of the text is the 'observer dilemma' that arises from the very situation of the observer to have decided on the object of observation—while inevitably leaving aside other objects. Such an un-observed object is attributed the 'unmarked state', the realm of all 'unmarked space'.

Laws of Form has influenced, among others, Heinz von Foerster, Louis Kauffman, Niklas Luhmann, Humberto Maturana, Francisco Varela, Leon Conrad, and William Bricken. Some of these authors have modified and extended the primary algebra, with interesting consequences.

=== Controversial mathematics ===
In a 1976 letter to the Editor of Nature, Spencer-Brown claimed a proof of the four-color theorem, which is not computer-assisted. The preface of the 1979 edition of Laws of Form repeats that claim, and further states that the generally accepted computational proof by Appel, Haken, and Koch has 'failed' (page xii). Spencer-Brown's claimed proof of the four-color theorem has yet to find any defenders; Kauffman provides a detailed review of parts of that work.

The 6th edition of Laws of Form advertises that it includes "the first-ever proof of Riemann's hypothesis".

== Personal life and death ==
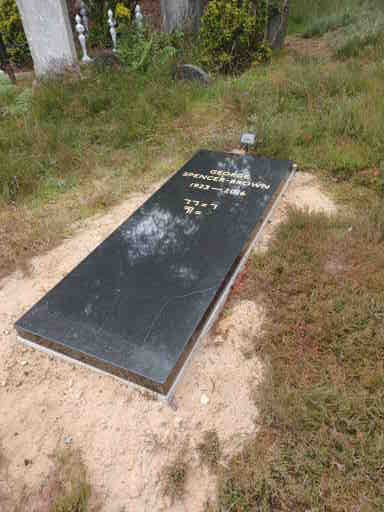
The burial place of George Spencer-Brown, located at the London Necropolis, Brookwood, Surrey. Inscriptions of the two fundamental axioms of the laws of form can be seen.

During his time at Cambridge, Spencer-Brown was a chess half-blue. He held two world records as a glider pilot, and was a sports correspondent to the Daily Express. He also wrote some novels and poems, sometimes employing the pen name James Keys.

Spencer-Brown died on 25 August 2016. He was buried at the London Necropolis, Brookwood, Surrey.

== Reception ==
While not denying some of his talent, not all critics of Spencer-Brown's claims and writings have been willing to assess them at his own valuation; the poetry is at the most charitable reading an idiosyncratic taste, and some prominent voices have been decidedly dismissive of the value of his formal material. For example Martin Gardner wrote in his essay: "M-Pire Maps":

In December of 1976 G. Spencer-Brown, the maverick British mathematician, startled his colleagues by announcing he had a proof of the four-color theorem that did not require computer checking. Spencer-Brown's supreme confidence and his reputation as a mathematician brought him an invitation to give a seminar on his proof at Stanford University. At the end of three months all the experts who attended the seminar agreed that the proofs logic was laced with holes, but Spencer-Brown returned to England still sure of its validity. The "proof' has not yet been published.
Spencer-Brown is the author of a curious little book called Laws of Form, which is essentially a reconstruction of the propositional calculus by means of an eccentric notation. The book, which the British mathematician John Horton Conway once described as beautifully written but "content-free," has a large circle of counterculture devotees.

== Selected publications ==
- 1953 "Statistical significance in psychical research", Nature 172(4369):154-156
- 1957. Probability and Scientific Inference
- 1961. Design with the Nor (first published in 2021).
- 1970. 23 degrees of Paradise.
- 1971. Only Two Can Play This Game (under pseudonym James Keys)
- Selected editions of Laws of Form:
  - 1969. London: Allen & Unwin.
  - 1972. Crown Publishers, hardcover. ISBN 0-517-52776-6
  - 1994. Cognizer Company, paperback. ISBN 0-9639899-0-1
  - 1997. German translation titled Gesetze der Form. Lübeck: Bohmeier Verlag. ISBN 3-89094-321-7
- "Claim of Proof to Four Colour Theorem." Letter to the Editor of Nature. 17 December 1976.

== See also ==
- Distinction – Fundamental philosophical abstraction; the recognition of difference
- Mark and space – States of a communications signal
