= Sarah Mullally =

Archbishop of Canterbury since 2026

The Most Reverend and Right Honourable Dame Sarah Mullally DBE PC
- Archbishop of Canterbury
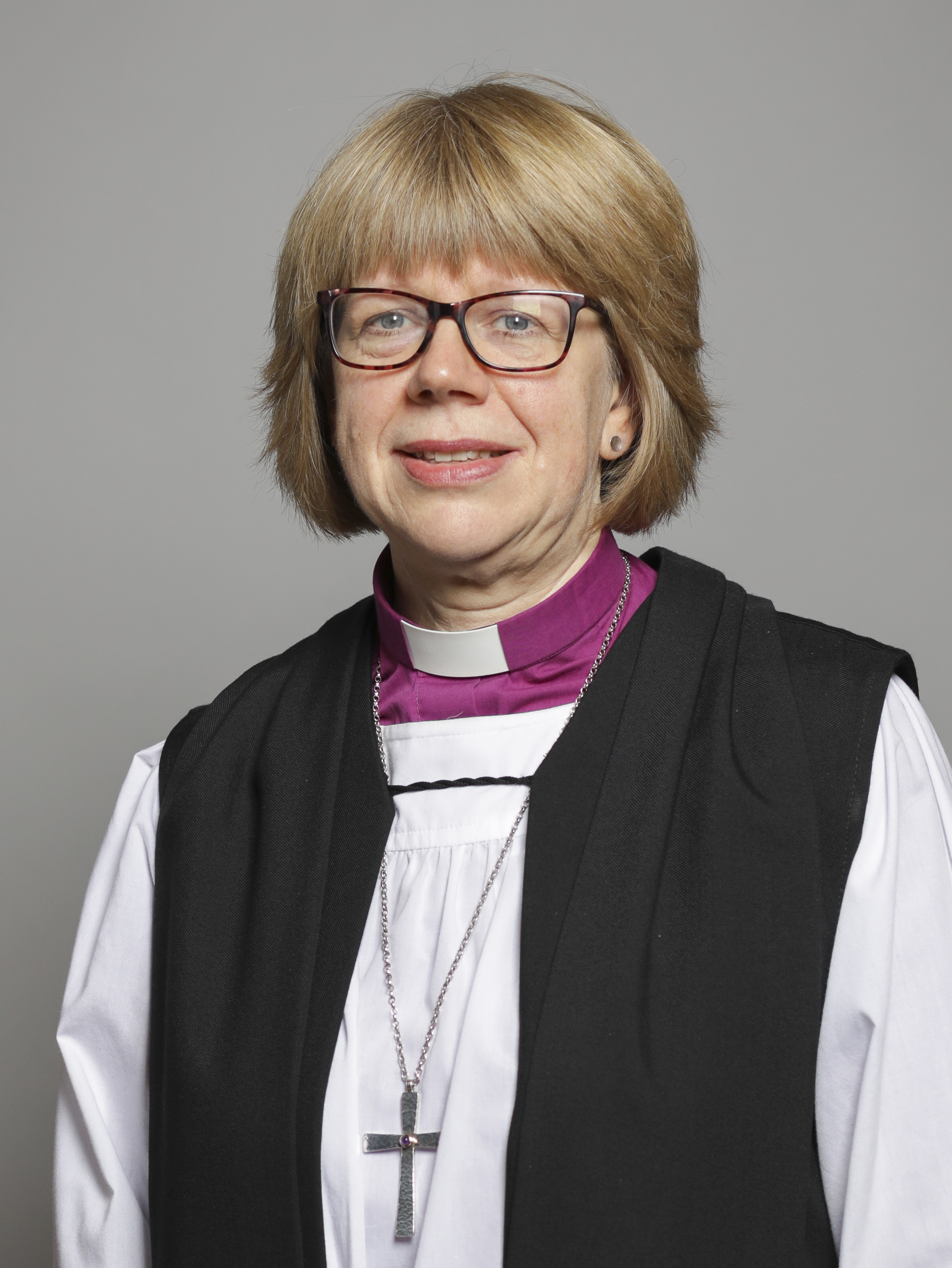
- Official portrait, 2019
- Church: Church of England
- Province: Canterbury
- Diocese: Canterbury
- Elected: 28 January 2026
- Installed: 25 March 2026
- Predecessor: Justin Welby
- Previous posts: Bishop of London (2018–2026); Bishop of Crediton (2015–2018); Chief Nursing Officer for England (1999–2004)

Orders
- Ordination: 2001 (deacon); 2002 (priest)
- Consecration: 22 July 2015 by Justin Welby

Personal details
- Born: Sarah Elisabeth Bowser; 26 March 1962 (age 64) Woking, Surrey, England
- Denomination: Anglican
- Residence: City of London
- Spouse: Eamonn Mullally (m. 1987)
- Children: 2
- Education: London South Bank University (BSc, MSc); South East Institute for Theological Education (Ord.); University of Kent (DipTh); Heythrop College, London (MA)
- Signature: Sarah Mullally's signature

Member of the House of Lords
- Lord Spiritual
- Ex officio as Archbishop of Canterbury; 4 February 2026
- Ex officio as Bishop of London; 10 April 2018 – 28 January 2026

Dame Sarah Elisabeth Mullally (née Bowser; born 26 March 1962) is a British Anglican bishop and former chief nursing officer for England who has served as the 106th archbishop of Canterbury since 28 January 2026. As archbishop, she is the senior bishop of the Church of England and the ceremonial head of the Anglican Communion. By virtue of her position, she is also a lord spiritual, one of the 26 Church of England bishops who sit in the House of Lords.

Born in Woking, Surrey, Mullally trained as a nurse and worked in several clinical and leadership roles in the National Health Service. She became chief nursing officer and director of patient experience for England in 1999, the youngest person to hold the posts, and was appointed Dame Commander of the Order of the British Empire in 2005 for services to nursing and midwifery. She left the NHS in 2004 to pursue full‑time ordained ministry.

Ordained priest in 2002, Mullally served in the Diocese of Southwark before becoming canon treasurer of Salisbury Cathedral in 2012. She was consecrated Bishop of Crediton in 2015 and translated to the Diocese of London in 2018, becoming the first woman to serve as Bishop of London. In 2026, she succeeded Justin Welby as Archbishop of Canterbury, becoming the first woman to lead the Church of England and the Anglican Communion.

== Early life and education ==
Sarah Elisabeth Bowser was born on 26 March 1962 in Woking, Surrey, and has two sisters and one brother. She was educated at Winston Churchill Comprehensive School and subsequently at Woking Sixth Form College. She was confirmed at St John's Church, Woking, and active in the Universities and Colleges Christian Fellowship.

When choosing her A-level subjects, Mullally stated that she "had to think seriously what I really wanted to do. I didn't want to be a doctor because I wanted to give holistic care". Her decision to pursue a career in nursing was also influenced by her Christian faith, which she has held since the age of 16. In 1980, she began reading for a nursing degree at South Bank Polytechnic, undertaking clinical placements at St Thomas' Hospital, and was awarded joint Registered General Nurse (RGN) status and a Bachelor of Science (BSc) degree in 1984. She completed a Master of Science (MSc) degree in inter-professional health and welfare studies at London South Bank University in 1992.

== Nursing career ==
Mullally held clinical nursing posts at St Thomas' Hospital and the Royal Marsden Hospital. She subsequently held a number of nursing leadership roles, first at the former Westminster Hospital, where she was a ward sister and head of practice development, and later as director of nursing at the Chelsea and Westminster Hospital. In 1999, she was appointed chief nursing officer and director of patient experience for England, becoming the youngest person to hold these positions. She also served as a non‑executive director of the English Board of Nursing, Midwifery and Health Visiting.

Mullally served as an independent governor of London South Bank University between 2005 and 2015, during which time she became vice-chairperson of the board of governors and chairwoman of the policy and resources committee. She was a non-executive director of the Royal Marsden NHS Foundation Trust from 2005 to 2012, and held a non-executive role at Salisbury NHS Foundation between 2012 and 2016. Mullally became a lay member of the council of King's College London in 2016.

== Ordained ministry ==
=== Parish ministry ===
From 1998 to 2001, Mullally trained for ordained ministry on a part-time basis at the South East Institute of Theological Education (now St Augustine's College of Theology). During this period, she also studied theology at the University of Kent, receiving a Diploma in Theology (DipTh) in 2001. She was ordained in the Church of England, made a deacon at Michaelmas 2001 (30 September) at Southwark Cathedral, and ordained priest the following Michaelmas (5 October 2002) at Holy Trinity, Clapham; both ordinations were conducted by Tom Butler, Bishop of Southwark. From 2001 to 2004, she served her curacy as a non-stipendiary minister at the parish of Battersea Fields in the Diocese of Southwark.

In 2004, Mullally left her position as chief nursing officer to pursue full-time ministry. She then served as an assistant curate at St Saviour's Church, Battersea Fields, from 2004 to 2006. She graduated with a Master of Arts (MA) degree in pastoral theology from Heythrop College, University of London, in 2006. That same year, she became team rector of the Sutton team ministry at St Nicholas Church, Sutton, London. Alongside her parish responsibilities, she taught ethics in the Diocese of Southwark, participated in an Anglican clergy leadership programme, and sat on the Church of England's dioceses commission. From 2012 to 2015, she served as canon treasurer of Salisbury Cathedral in the Diocese of Salisbury.

=== Bishop of Crediton ===
In June 2015, it was announced that Mullally would be the next bishop of Crediton, a suffragan bishop in the Diocese of Exeter. She was consecrated bishop on 22 July 2015 by Archbishop Justin Welby at Canterbury Cathedral. She and Rachel Treweek were the first women to be consecrated as bishops at Canterbury Cathedral. In September 2015, Mullally became the first woman in the Church of England to lead an ordination service, ordaining two deacons, Leisa McGovern and Sheila Walker, as priests at St Mary's Church, Ottery St Mary, Devon.

=== Bishop of London ===
On 18 December 2017, it was announced that Mullally would be the next bishop of London, succeeding Richard Chartres, who had retired in February 2017. The bishop of London is the third most senior bishop in the Church of England, after the archbishops of Canterbury and York. Between her confirmation and installation, she was licensed as an honorary assistant bishop in the Diocese of Exeter so that she could undertake engagements related to her former see. She was elected to the see by the college of canons of St Paul's Cathedral on 25 January 2018, and was translated and took full legal possession of the see at the confirmation of her election on 8 March at St Mary-le-Bow. She assumed full duties upon her installation at St Paul's Cathedral on 12 May. On 15 July 2020, she acted as principal consecrator at the consecration of Hugh Nelson and Ruth Bushyager to the episcopate. This represented a break with tradition, as the archbishop of Canterbury usually takes this role, and it was the first time a female bishop had led a consecration service in the Church of England.

Sworn of the Privy Council of the United Kingdom on 14 March 2018, Mullally was introduced to the House of Lords to sit on the Lords Spiritual benches on 24 May 2018. She sat by virtue of her office, as the Bishop of London is one of five Church of England bishops who automatically receive a seat in the Lords.

She succeeded Richard Chartres and became the first female dean of the Chapel Royal on 12 July 2019. Mullally played a leading role in the 2023 coronation, one of three female prelates involved in the ceremonies.

== Archbishop of Canterbury ==
=== Election ===
On 3 October 2025, the Church of England announced that Mullally would become the next archbishop of Canterbury (ABC), in succession to Justin Welby. As such, she is Primate of All England and the metropolitan bishop of the Province of Canterbury. She is the first woman to hold the post, and only the second since the Middle Ages to hold the office without a degree from Oxford or Cambridge. Mullally was elected by the college of canons in December, and her election was legally confirmed at St. Paul's Cathedral on 28 January 2026, at which point she became Archbishop of Canterbury and ceased to be Bishop of London. She was re-introduced to the House of Lords in her new role on 5 February 2026. She was formally installed at Canterbury Cathedral on 25 March, marking the beginning of her public ministry in the role.

Her appointment drew opposition from some conservative Anglican groups. Within the Church of England, the conservative evangelical Church Society stated that her election "creates additional problems of disunity in the Church in England and around the world" and expressed concern regarding her views on same‑sex relationships, while the traditionalist Anglo-Catholic organisation Forward in Faith, which rejects the ordination of women as priests and bishops, recognised her as the "true and lawful holder of that office". Some Anglican churches, particularly in Africa, opposed her due to their stance on the ordination of women and to Mullally's views on the blessing of same-sex couples. The Global Fellowship of Confessing Anglicans (Gafcon), a conservative Anglican group mostly based in Africa and Asia, expressed its "sorrow" at her appointment, saying that it showed that the Church of England "has relinquished its authority to lead".

Archbishop Stephen Kaziimba of the Church of Uganda stated his "sadness" at her appointment due to "her support and advocacy for unbiblical positions on sexuality and same-sex marriage that reveal her departure from the historic Anglican positions that uphold the authority of Scripture for faith and life". Other Anglican groups in Africa have supported her; Bishop Emily Onyango of Kenya said that Mullally's election indicated that "things will be done differently [...] We know there will be justice in the church". The primate of the Anglican Church of Southern Africa, Thabo Makgoba, said that Mullally's election was a "thrilling development".

=== In office ===
On 27 April 2026, Pope Leo XIV and Mullally held a historic meeting at the Vatican, marking the first official encounter between a pope and a female leader of the Church of England. The religious leaders agreed on unity, shared prayer, and continuing to address global issues together despite existing theological differences.

On 11 September 2026, Mullally gave an award for reconciliation and interfaith cooperation to Pakistani Muslim mufti Tahir Mehmood Ashrafi. After it was revealed that Ashrafi made a 2007 speech praising Osama Bin Laden for "fighting for Islam against the Russians, Americans and British", Mullally withdrew the award. UK Conservative politicians Rebecca Paul, Nick Timothy, and Kemi Badenoch, the leader of the opposition, also criticised Mullally and the Church of England over a photograph of the event showing Ashrafi's wife wearing a niqab, referring to mandatory veiling laws in Afghanistan and Iran and social pressure on Muslim girls in the UK to veil themselves. Ashrafi said that the criticism of his 2007 comments was unfair and that his words had been taken out of context. He emphasised that it was his wife's and daughter's choice to wear the niqab. He also stated that Mullaly was being criticised by conservative opponents within the Church of England for political reasons. The Moderator of the Church of Pakistan, Azad Marshall, criticised the Church of England's handling of the affair and said that Ashrafi was owed an apology, citing Ashrafi's condemnation of the Jaranwala church arsons in 2023 and his work on interfaith matters.

In September 2026, Mullally visited the United States where she addressed the House of Bishops of the Episcopal Church in Navasota, Texas, preached at Christ Church in Greenwich, Connecticut, and Saint Thomas Church in New York City, and met the Secretary-General of the United Nations (António Guterres) and members of other international organisations.

== Views ==
=== Reparations for slavery ===
In summer 2026, Mullally emphasized her commitment to reparations for slavery, although she had been warned against such a course by 27 Peers and MPs in January 2026.

Mullally plans to fund the £100 million slavery reparations initiative from the Church Commissioners’ Endowment Fund, the investment fund that supports the Church of England. The money is intended to be transferred into a separate charitable fund, known as Project Spire, to support communities affected by the transatlantic slave trade. The funding proposal stems from an investigation into the Church of England’s historical financial links to slavery.

=== Ordination of women ===
Mullally is a self-described feminist and has ordained both men and women. According to the Financial Times, she "is seen as a theological liberal". She has also expressed support for the inclusion within the Church of England of those who reject the ordination of women, stating upon her announcement as the next Bishop of London: "I am very respectful of those who, for theological reasons, cannot accept my role as a priest or a bishop. My belief is that Church diversity throughout London should flourish and grow; everybody should be able to find a spiritual home."

=== Sexuality and marriage ===
In September 2016, she became one of ten bishops to make up the church's "Bishops' reflection group on sexuality". In relation to same-sex relationships, she stated in 2017: "It is a time for us to reflect on our tradition and scripture, and together say how we can offer a response that is about it being inclusive love." When asked about LGBT people in the church, she added: "What we have to remember is this is about people, and the church seeks to demonstrate love to all, because it reflects the God of love, who loves everybody." In 2018, Mullally stated that she supported the Church of England's traditional teaching that marriage is between one man and one woman. In 2022, she supported the observance of LGBT+ history month and the launch of an advisory group aimed at advising the diocese on "pastoral care and inclusion of LGBT+ people in the life of our church communities".

=== Bereavement ===
Mullally chaired the UK Commission on Bereavement and is currently patron of the bereavement charity AtaLoss.

=== Abortion ===
Mullally has previously described her views on abortion as favouring abortion rights, although she would lean against abortion faced with her own decision. She has said: "I would suspect that I would describe my approach to this issue as pro-choice rather than pro-life although if it were a continuum I would be somewhere along it moving towards pro-life when it relates to my choice and then enabling choice when it related to others." In June 2025, she opposed legislation that would extend abortion rights by decriminalising terminations in utero up to full term. Mullally acknowledged, but did not sign, an open letter from Anglican clergy that described the bill as a "dangerous change" to the law.

=== Israel and Palestine ===
In her address shortly after her ABC nomination, she said: "I long for that same hope for all those around the world caught up in war. For those living in extreme poverty. For those on the front lines of the ever-worsening climate crisis. For our Palestinian Christian brothers and sisters, and all the peoples of the Middle East. For the people of Ukraine, Russia, Sudan, Myanmar and the DRC. May God end the horrors of war, comfort those who mourn, and bring hope to those living in despair. And I pray especially for Anglicans in those places, as they suffer alongside the people they seek to love and care for."

In May 2026, during a visit to the Sternberg Centre for Judaism in north London, Mullally expressed solidarity with the Jewish community of the UK on behalf of the Church of England.

In June 2026, she called for an end to the Israeli occupation of Palestine.

=== Artificial intelligence ===
In June 2026, Mullally initiated the House of Lords debate "Artificial Intelligence: Impact on Human Relationships and Society" providing remarks warning that, "We are in danger of unleashing AI into our lives and societies without the theological, philosophical and spiritual framework with which to make decisions about creating, controlling, using or directing it."

== Personal life ==
In 1987, she married Eamonn Mullally, an IT and enterprise architect; the couple have a daughter and a son and live in London. Following her appointment as Bishop of London, Mullally moved into the Old Deanery of St Paul's. As archbishop, she resides at Lambeth Palace. She has dyslexia and has said that she finds it difficult to read out biblical genealogies.

== Honours ==
In the 2005 New Year Honours, Mullally was appointed Dame Commander of the Order of the British Empire (DBE) in recognition of her contribution to nursing and midwifery. The use of the honorific "Dame Sarah" is at her discretion, and it was often omitted when she was announced as the next Bishop of London in 2017.

Mullally's academic honours include election as a fellow of London South Bank University in 2001, and as a fellow of Canterbury Christ Church University in 2006. She has received honorary doctorates from Bournemouth University (2004), the University of Wolverhampton (2004), the University of Hertfordshire (2005), the University of Exeter (2019), and the University of Plymouth (2021).

Church of England titles
Preceded by Nick McKinnel	Bishop of Crediton; 2015–2018	Succeeded by Jackie Searle
Preceded by Richard Chartres	Bishop of London; 2018–2026	Vacant
Preceded by Justin Welby	Archbishop of Canterbury; 2026–present	Incumbent
Order of precedence in England and Wales and in Northern Ireland
Preceded by Princess Alexandra, The Hon. Lady Ogilvy	Ladies as Archbishop of Canterbury	Succeeded by The Baroness Carr of Walton-on-the-Hill as Lady Chief Justice of England and Wales
