= Winston Churchill School (England) =

The Winston Churchill School
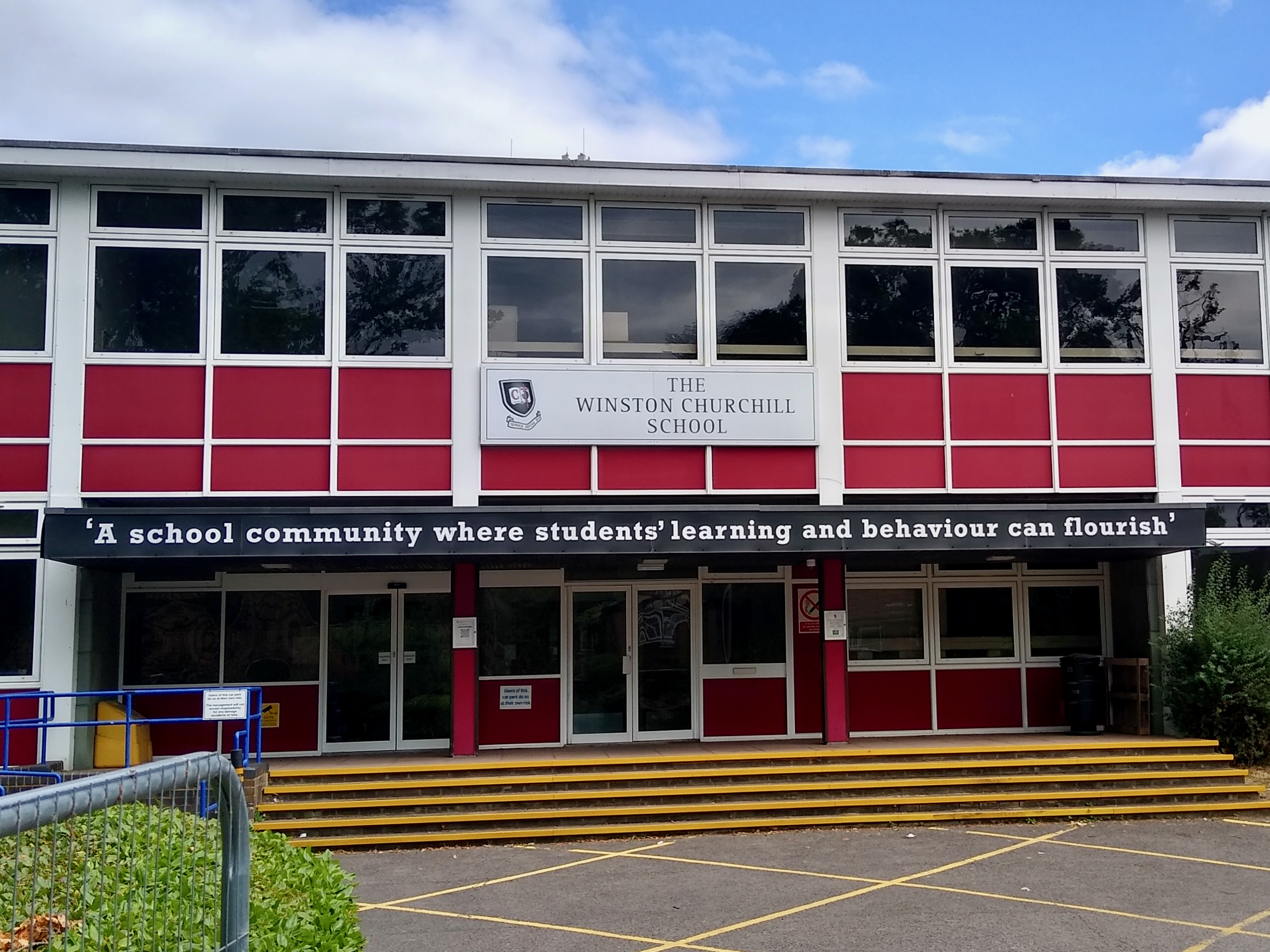

Location
- Hermitage Road; Woking, Surrey, GU21 8TL; England; 51.3129°N 0.6014°W

Information
- Type: foundation comprehensive
- Motto: Service before Self
- Established: 1967
- Local authority: Surrey
- Department for Education URN: 125314 Tables
- Ofsted: Reports
- Head teacher: Unknown
- Gender: Mixed
- Age: 11 to 16
- Enrolment: 1502
- Average class size: 30
- Website: www.wcsc.org.uk

The Winston Churchill School is a comprehensive, secondary school in Woking, England. The school was established in 1967. It is near Knaphill, Bisley, West End, Brookwood and Pirbright. The school holds Specialist Sports College status.

== Academics ==
The Winston Churchill School received a score of "good" from OFSTED in April 2018, with GCSE results above the national average. "The curriculum is a strength of the school ...teaching is good with aspects that are outstanding ...students behaviour both in and out of classrooms is good" and "students feel safe & secure".

The most recent short inspection by OFSTED on 14 and 15 November 2023 found that "This is an inclusive school, with high expectations for pupils' conduct and achievement." and that "Behaviour around the school site is generally calm and respectful and the significant majority of pupils meet the school's high expectations for conduct well".

== Leadership ==
Headteacher Zoe Johnson-Walker died on 29/10/2026 following a medical incident at the school. A replacement headteacher is yet to be announced. Zoe Johnson-Walker continued to serve the school up until her death, such as through her publicly praised initiative to sell school uniforms at a reduced cost.

== Awards and recognition ==
In 2025, the Winston Churchill School's music department was named 'Music Department of the Year' at the Music and Drama Education Awards, held on Thursday, 30 January, at the Royal National Hotel in London. This accolade recognised the department's outstanding contributions to music education and its impact within the school and the local community.

The head of music at the Winston Churchill School was honoured as the 'Secondary School Music Teacher of the Year' at the Classic FM Music Teacher of the Year Awards 2024.

The Winston Churchill School was a finalist for 'Secondary School of the Year' at the Education Today Awards 2024.

== Criticism ==
Recent years have seen the Winston Churchill School face much controversy in the press.

In May 2025, the school banned jumpers, despite cold temperatures, creating outrage amongst parents.. Jumpers are still not permitted in the recently reformed school uniform.

In July 2024, the school was found to be a serious risk to life, due to the fire risk posed by its buildings.

In April 2023, the school was closed for a day, due to maggots falling into food from the ceiling of the school canteen.

In July 2022, a suspended ceiling collapsed into a classroom.

== Planetarium ==
The Winston Churchill School is the first state school in the UK to have its own permanent planetarium on campus. It was opened on 10 December 2019 by the fifth incarnation of The Doctor and former Winston Churchill School student Peter Davison. The planetarium is also open to the public out of school times, showing films on astronomy and holding lectures and space talks.

== Radio Woking ==
Radio Woking is a UK community radio station owned and operated by the school, broadcasting on DAB in the boroughs of Woking and Rushmoor and throughout the world online. Students at the school are trained and get the opportunity to broadcast regularly on the station.

Presenters on the station are volunteers and the station broadcasts a wide range of programmes featuring local guests, sports clubs and specialist music shows.

== Notable alumni and faculty ==
- Robert Atkinson, footballer
- Jonathan Cole, Director of Information at Army Command
- Peter Davison, actor (The Fifth Doctor in Doctor Who, All Creatures Great and Small)
- Joanna Forbes L'Estrange, composer, Fellow of the Royal School of Church Music
- Philip Gould, Baron Gould of Brookwood, architect of New Labour
- Deborah James, journalist
- Dame Sarah Mullally, Archbishop of Canterbury
- Sam Underwood, actor (Dexter, Homeland, The Following)
