= Sheet's Heath Common =

Coordinates: 51.309°N 0.641°W

Sheet's Heath Common near Brookwood, Surrey, England, is a Site of Special Scientific Interest (SSSI), part of the larger Colony Bog and Bagshot Heath SSSI. It is also part of the Thames Basin Heaths Special Protection area, a network of sites protected for their ground nesting birds.
