= Leon Conrad =

British artist

Leon Conrad (born 15 September 1965) is a British polymath: writer, story structure consultant, educator, and specialist in historic needlework techniques known particularly for historically-styled blackwork embroidery designs.

== Early life and education ==
Conrad was born in London. He grew up in Putney, attended Willington School for a year before moving to Alexandria, Egypt where he first attended El Nasr Girls' College and then Victoria College, Alexandria. He moved back to the UK in 1983, studying piano privately with Sidney Harrison and then at the City Literary Institute with Kenneth van Barthold gaining his LRAM teaching certificate before entering Trinity Laban Conservatoire of Music and Dance in 1986, graduating with Honours in 1989.

He trained in the Estill Voice Training method with Jo Estill, in Vocal Profile Analysis with Christina Shewell, through the British Voice Association; and in voice with Janice Chapman. He studied physical theatre with Desmond Jones, theatre improvisation with Keith Johnstone, and mask theatre with Steve Jarand.

As a historic needlework practitioner, he was apprenticed to master embroiderer and specialist in Blackwork embroidery, Jack Robinson. Conrad went on to gain an MA degree in the History of Design and Material Culture of the Renaissance (V&A/RCA, 2005). His thesis was on the history of English 16th and 17th century woven and embroidered textile bookbindings.

As a storyteller, Conrad has been studying the little-known Jewish oral storytelling tradition with Drust’syla Shonaleigh Cumbers since 2015.

== Career ==
=== Background and work ===
Conrad worked as musical director in charge of school workshops for Opera Brava (1988–1990), as Lecturer in Musical Theatre at the Maurice Lane Academy of Performing Arts and at Crawley College. He set up the UK’s first specialist voice consultancy, The Conrad Voice Consultancy, (1990), which became The Academy of Oratory (2012–).

As a specialist in historic needlework, Conrad has demonstrated, taught, and published needlework charts and kits inspired by historic techniques in the UK, Europe, and the USA. He founded his design company, Leon Conrad Designs in 1998. He has exhibited widely both as an individual artist and with The New Elizabethans Embroidery Group which he founded in 1997. He is the winner of the 2025 World's Best Award for 'Cultural Storytelling and History'.

Conrad was invited to be Poet-in-Residence at the First Edinburgh Food Festival (2006) and invited back to be Poet-in-Residence at the Pleasance Theatre for the Edinburgh Fringe (2007).

As a tutor, Conrad is inspired by classical Liberal Arts education and specialises in tutoring gifted and twice exceptional students. He is the winner of the 2023 Corporate Vision Award for 'Best Scholarship Exam Tutoring Company - London'. and the 2022 Media Innovation Award for 'Most Eloquent Tutor and Training Provider'.

As a voiceover artist, Conrad provided the narration for Ragamala Dance Company's Children of Dharma (premiered at Northrop, MN, 2 November 2024), and the audiobook of Aesop The Storyteller.

Since 2010, Conrad's research has focused on the application of George Spencer-Brown’s work to the analysis and mapping of story structure.

He has participated in over 20 exhibitions and has taught at embroidery seminars in the UK and the United States. His wife, Tanya Conrad, died in 2024.

=== Books ===
- “Story and Structure: A complete guide”, winner of twelve literary awards including the IPNE Nonfiction Book of the Year Award 2022, finalist in The People's Book Prize 2022 and recipient of the BREW Seal of Excellence and two category titles of the BREW Book Excellence Award, demonstrates a much wider application of story than generally assumed; presents new insights into story as a dynamic force of life (ISBN 978-1906069254).
- “Odyssey: Dynamic Learning System”, with David Pinto, an innovative approach to inspirational learning experiences (ISBN 978-1782792963).
- “History Riddles”, a collection of 30 riddles based on key people and events across a period of over 4,500 years (ISBN 978-1782792949).
- “Aesop The Storyteller”, a collection of 12 versified Aesopic Fables with CD (ISBN 978-0955639104). Second edition print only (ISBN 978-0955639180), eBook (ISBN 978-0955639197), also available as an audio book.
- Contributed blackwork embroidery designs to the book The Essential Guide to Embroidery, published in 2002 (ISBN 1-85391-988-8).

=== Articles and reviews ===
- “A Treatise on Plaited Braid Stitch: Parts 1 & 2”, in 'Fine Lines' - the Magazine of the Historic Needlework Guild, Summer 2003, Vol 8, Issues 1 & 2, being the first correct demonstration of how the historic needlework stitch was worked in 400 years.
- Numerous reviews for fringe theatre performances for the British Theatre Guide, Broadway Baby, and Remote Goat.
- Articles on classical Liberal Arts education, the application of George Spencer-Brown’s work to the practice of classical logic, and the analysis of story structure.
- Conrad's designs have been published in New Stitches Magazine, The Needleworker, Classic Stitches, Needlecraft, Cross-Stitch Gold, and FineLines
