= St Mary of Bethany Church =

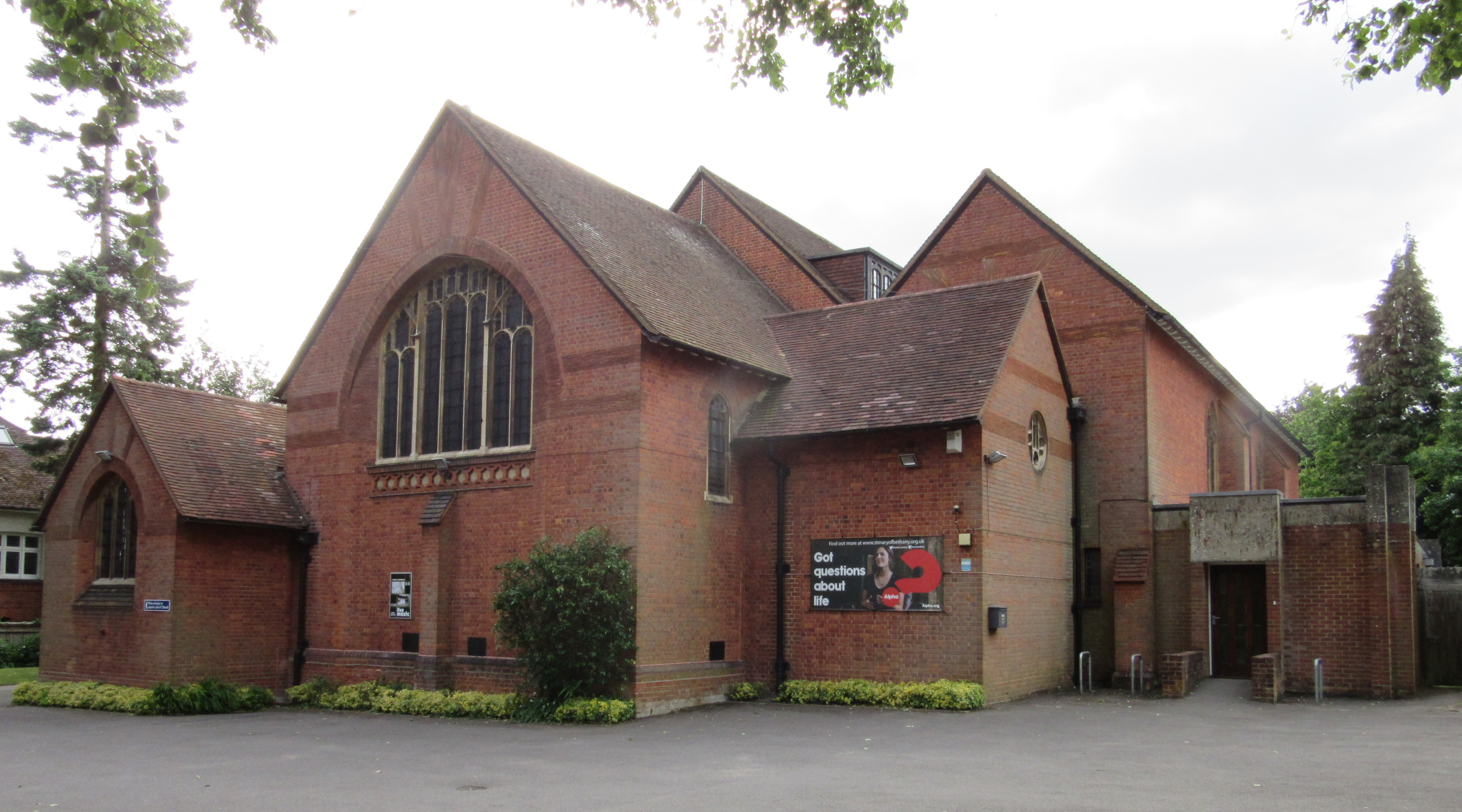
- St Mary of Bethany Church, Woking, from Mount Hermon Road
- St Mary of Bethany Church
- 51°18′40″N 0°34′05″W
- Location: Woking
- Country: England
- Denomination: Church of England
- Website: St Mary of Bethany Church website

History
- Founded: 1906
- Consecrated: 1907

Architecture
- Functional status: Active
- Architect: W. D. Caröe
- Groundbreaking: 1906
- Completed: 1907

Administration
- Province: Canterbury
- Diocese: Guildford
- Deanery: Woking
- Parish: St Mary of Bethany

Clergy
- Vicar: Mark Wallace

Listed Building – Grade II
- Official name: Church of St Mary of Bethany
- Designated: 6 January 1984
- Reference no.: 1236965

St Mary of Bethany Church is located in Woking, England. The church is in the Diocese of Guildford.

== History ==
St Mary of Bethany Church was founded to service the expanding town of Woking in Surrey. The Rev William Hamilton the vicar of Christ Church Woking saw a need for the expanding town south of the railway. Three plots of land between Mount Hermon Road and York Road were purchased in 1899 when the farmland was offered for development.

The building was started in 1906 and finished in 1907 as a Chapel of Ease to Christ Church.

It was designed by W. D. Caröe and was consecrated on 5 November 1907 by Herbert Edward Ryle, the Bishop of Winchester.

Inside the building are war memorials for the First and Second World Wars.

=== Building design ===
Free tudor gothic design. Built of brick with tiled and stone dressings. Tiled roof. Listing NGR: TQ0022758201

The building is Grade II listed.

=== List of vicars ===
Tenure	Name
1924-1944	Rev Stanley Phillips
1945-1953	Rev Jack Marshall
1953-1962	Rev Robert Brettell
1962-1970	Rev Raymond Lee
1971-1983	Rev Norman Norgate
1984-2004	Rev Roger Derbridge
2005-2016	Rev Steve Beak
2017-	Rev Mark Wallace
