= Dan Harris (American football) =

American football coach and college athletics administrator

Coaching career (HC unless noted)
- 1991: Baker

Administrative career (AD unless noted)
- ?–2009: Baker

Head coaching record
- Overall: 6–2–1

Accomplishments and honors

Championships
- 1 HAAC (1991)

Dan Harris is an American former football coach and college athletics administrator. He was the head football coach at Baker University in Baldwin City, Kansas. He held that position for the 1991 season. His coaching record at Baker 6–2–1.

Harris later became athletic director at the school, where he retired in 2009 after being named the "Under Armour Athletic Director of the Year" for the central division.

== Head coaching record ==
Year	Team	Overall	Conference	Standing	Bowl/playoffs
Baker Wildcats (Heart of America Athletic Conference) (1991)
1991	Baker	6–2–1	5–1	T–1st	
Baker:		6–2–1	5–1		
Total:		6–2–1			
National championship Conference title Conference division title or championship game berth
