= St John's Church, Woking =

St John's
- St John the Baptist Church
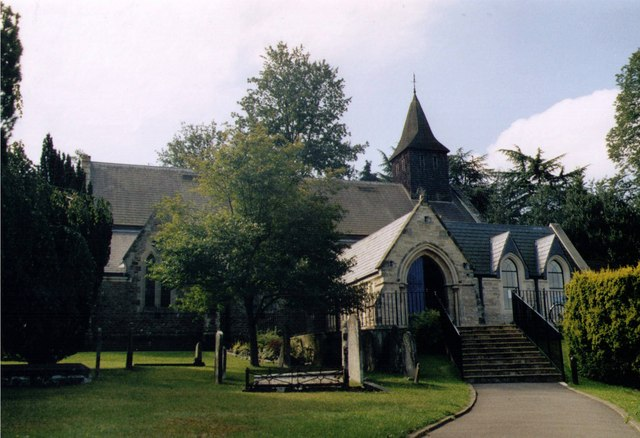
- St John's Church, Woking
- St John's
- 51.31044°N 0.59292°W
- OS grid reference: SU 98169 57753
- Location: St John's, Woking
- Country: England
- Denomination: Church of England
- Churchmanship: Conservative evangelical
- Website: St John's Website

History
- Founded: 1840
- Founder: Revd Charles Bowles
- Consecrated: 24 June 1842

Architecture
- Functional status: Active
- Architect: Sir George Gilbert Scott
- Architectural type: Gothic Revival
- Groundbreaking: 1840
- Completed: 1842

Administration
- Province: Canterbury
- Diocese: Guildford
- Parish: St John's

Clergy
- Vicar: Rev'd Glyn Lucas

St John's Church is located in St John's, Woking, England. The church is in the parish of St John's, Diocese of Guildford, which in turn is in the Province of Canterbury. The local village is named after the church.

== History ==
In the early nineteenth century a settlement was beginning to form around the location of present-day St Johns, with the area home to a large brick-making and nursery industry. A reminder of the brick-making remains today in the form of a 'Kiln Bridge' over the Basingstoke Canal. The canal was also influential in the growth of the community. Due to the inconvenience of travelling to the nearest parish church (St Peter's in Old Woking), the vicar of St Peter's, Rev'd Charles Bowles, amassed £1,500 in order to serve the western end of the parish of St Peter's, i.e. the new community now known as 'St Johns'.

Sir George Gilbert Scott, the Victorian architect who found fame through constructions such as St Pancras railway station, was commissioned by Bowles to design a simple church for the local community. A lithograph of Gilbert's plans remains in St John's Church today. On 24 June 1842, the church was consecrated by the Bishop of Winchester. The church is of a Gothic Revival Style, built with stone similar to that used to build churches in the thirteenth-century.

=== Present day ===
St John's stands in the conservative evangelical tradition of the Church of England, and the parochial church council (PCC) have endorsed GAFCON's Jerusalem Declaration.

== Additions ==
=== Additions to the Church ===
St John's Church itself has had many additions to it since its consecration. The original simple church was without aisles. However, between 1879 and 1883 aisles and vestries were adding, doubling the size of the church. It was in 1884 that the church and surrounding area achieved parish status.

In 1904, the pitch pine balcony that was in place was removed, due to lack of use. Furthermore, the original organ was built by Henry Bryceson. Moreover, the reredos, Holy Table and oak panelling were made in Exeter and were installed in 1915, followed by the installation of a choir vestry, which was added in the 1930s. The organs was rebuilt in 1948. The baptism pool in the chancel, oak font, communion table and lectern was added in the modernisation of the church in 2002.

The church hall was built in 1956 and was refitted as a Youth Centre in 1992. This church hall was followed by a series of extensions in the 1970s, with a lounge, narthex and offices being added. These were not the final work to the church, however, and in 2002, the lighting and heating was improved and the flooring and seating replaced. Furthermore, the welcome area of the church has been enlarged, forcing the porch to be rebuilt to accommodate.

=== Additions as a result of the Church ===
In the vicinity of the church, a number of structures were constructed as a result of the church's presence, e.g. a vicarage. Built to serve the vicars of St Peter's, a vicarage was built nearby to the church under Rev'd Charles Bowles. The building remains, however it was replaced with the current newer built in 1952. Furthermore, the Bowles family once again contributed to the local community, through the construction of a local school. Used until the 1970s, it was used for Sunday school and youth school. Furthermore, it was also used as the local Scout hut.

== Features ==
=== Windows ===
There are many features in the church that are of note. Firstly, the stained glass, made in Munich, is dedicated to the memory of the Rev'd Charles Bowles. It depicts the Crucifixion, with Jesus blessing children and raising the son of the widow of Nain.

Moreover, a window at the main entrance, installed in 1979, tells the stories of Psalm 1 and Revelation 1. The window is surrounded by the Holy Spirit with the wind blowing through it. There are numerous other memorials around the church, as well as several other stained glass windows.

=== Other ===
The communion rail has the name of former cricketer and Bishop of Liverpool, David Sheppard, engraved. Furthermore, a carved oak pulpit, given to the church in 1899, replaced the original, which was given to Holy Trinity Church in the nearby village of Knaphill. The kneelers in the church were hand-made by members of the local community and congregation; the kneelers depict a variety of images, including local images, spiritual images and (for the larger ones), the Seven Days of Creation.

An interesting note is that the mosaic tiles on the floor were made by women inmates of the former Woking Prison, who also contributed towards the making of some of the tiles in St Paul's Cathedral.

== Graveyard ==
The earliest readable gravestone is from the Waterer family, who were involved in the local nursing business. The graveyard was extended to the South and the East in 1885. Furthermore, there are many gravestone that could be of note. The graveyard contains the Grave of Lt. Edgar Oliphant Anstey; Anstey, who was killed during the final stand of the 1st Battalion 24th Regiment in the Battle of Isandlwana, is believed to be the first South Australian to die in an overseas battle. Moreover, there is also a gravestone with the unusual name of 'David Goliath'. The graveyard also contains a weeping beech. There are two vaults to the Bowles family in the graveyard. The architect to the Metropolitan Police, John Dixon Butler, is interred at the church.

In 1913, a new graveyard was opened and contains the war memorial, with the motto 'dulce et decorum est pro patria mori', which roughly translates from Latin as 'it is sweet and fitting to die for one's country'. Both graveyards are now closed for burials, although ashes can still be placed in the Garden of Remembrance. This was paired in 1996 with a Wall of Remembrance to commemorate those placed in the Garden of Remembrance.
