= All Souls' Church, Sutton Green =

All Souls' Church
- All Souls'
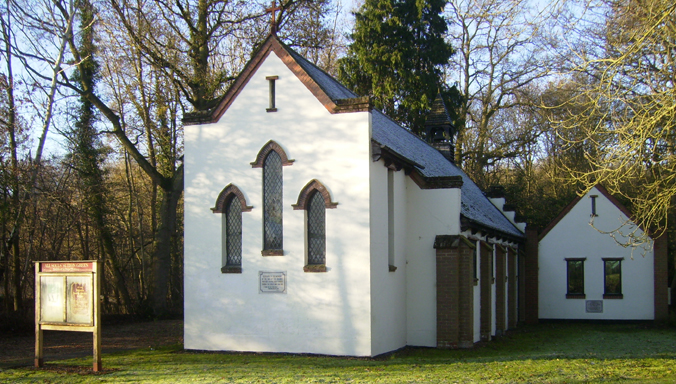
- All Souls' Church, Sutton Green
- All Souls' Church
- 51°17′3.98″N 0°33′37.47″W
- Location: Guildford
- Country: England
- Denomination: Church of England
- Website: stpeterwoking.org

History
- Founded: 1921
- Consecrated: March 1922

Architecture
- Functional status: Active
- Architectural type: Gothic Revival

Specifications
- Materials: Brick

Administration
- Province: Canterbury
- Diocese: Guildford
- Parish: St Peter, Woking

Clergy
- Vicar: Rev'd Jonathan Thomas

All Souls' Church is located in Sutton Green, Guildford, England. The church is in the Parish of Woking St Peter and the Diocese of Guildford.

== History ==
The church was built in 1921 as a memorial to those lost in the recent First World War. It was funded by donations from the local community and was consecrated in March 1922 by John Randolph, the Suffragan Bishop of Guildford. The church has the ability to comfortably sit around eighty adults. In 2003, the church was extended with a Church Room, which cost £56,000. This is used for Sunday club activities, after-service refreshments and church meetings.
