= Brookwood Hospital =

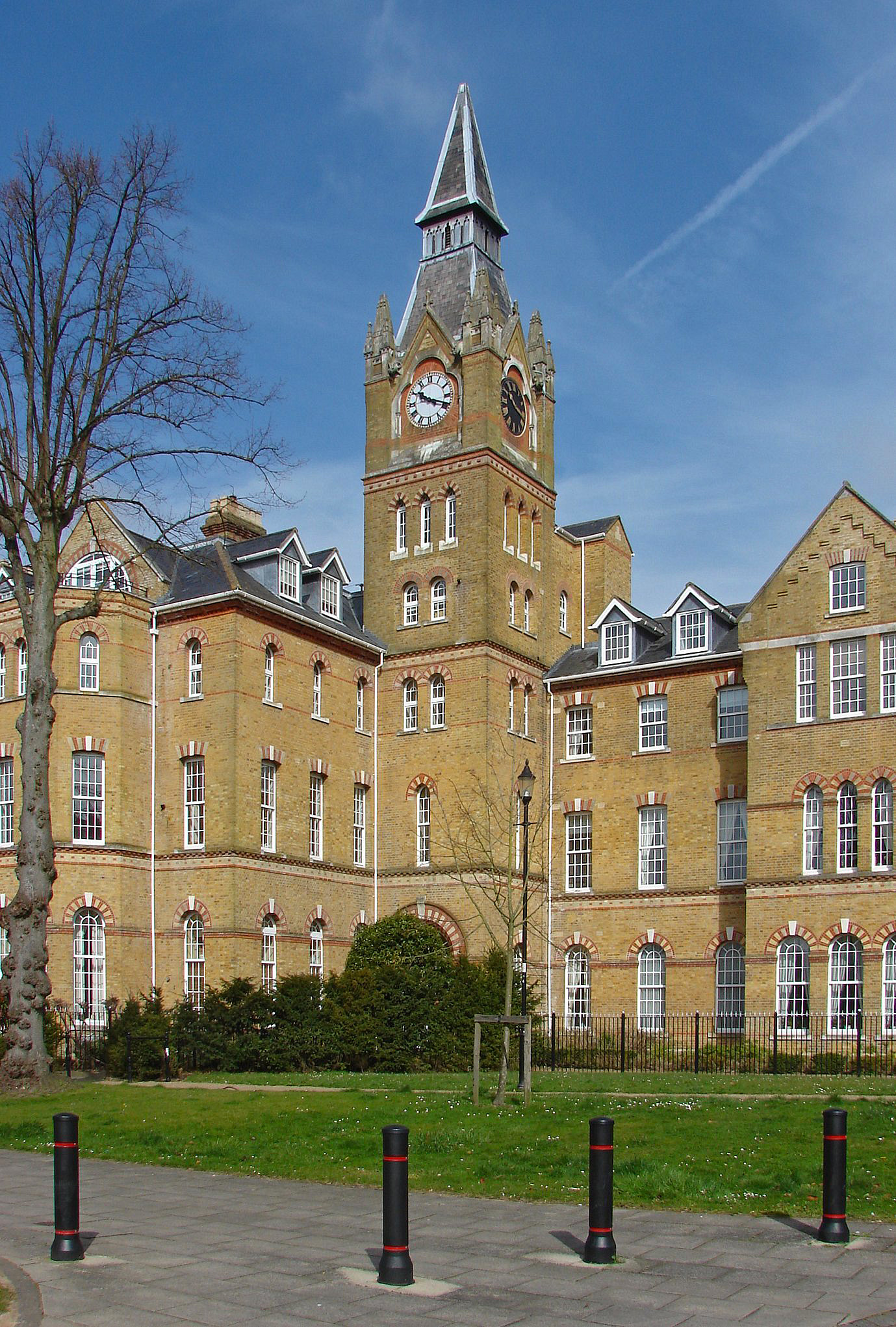
- Brookwood Hospital

- Shown in Surrey

Geography
- Location: Brookwood, England, United Kingdom
- Coordinates: 51.315°N 0.617°W

Organisation
- Care system: Public NHS
- Type: Public

Services
- Emergency department: No Accident & Emergency

History
- Founded: 1867
- Closed: 1994

Links
- Lists: Hospitals in England

Brookwood Hospital at Knaphill (near Woking) in Surrey, was established in 1867 by Surrey Quarter Sessions as the second County Asylum, the first being Springfield Asylum in Tooting (1840). A third asylum, Cane Hill Hospital at Coulsdon in the eastern part of the county, followed in 1882.

== History ==
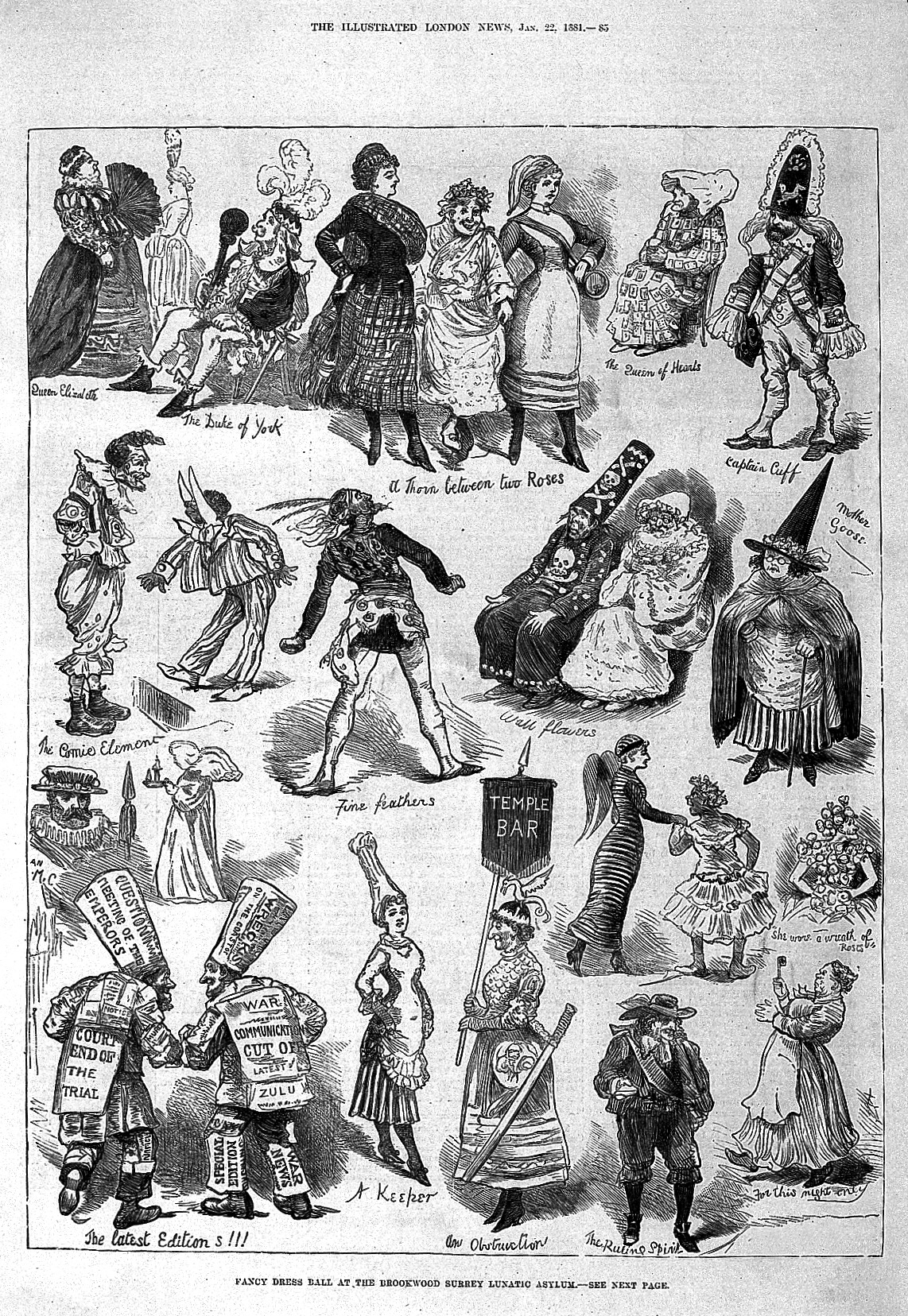
Depiction of a fancy dress ball at Brookwood Asylum shown in The Illustrated London News, 1881.

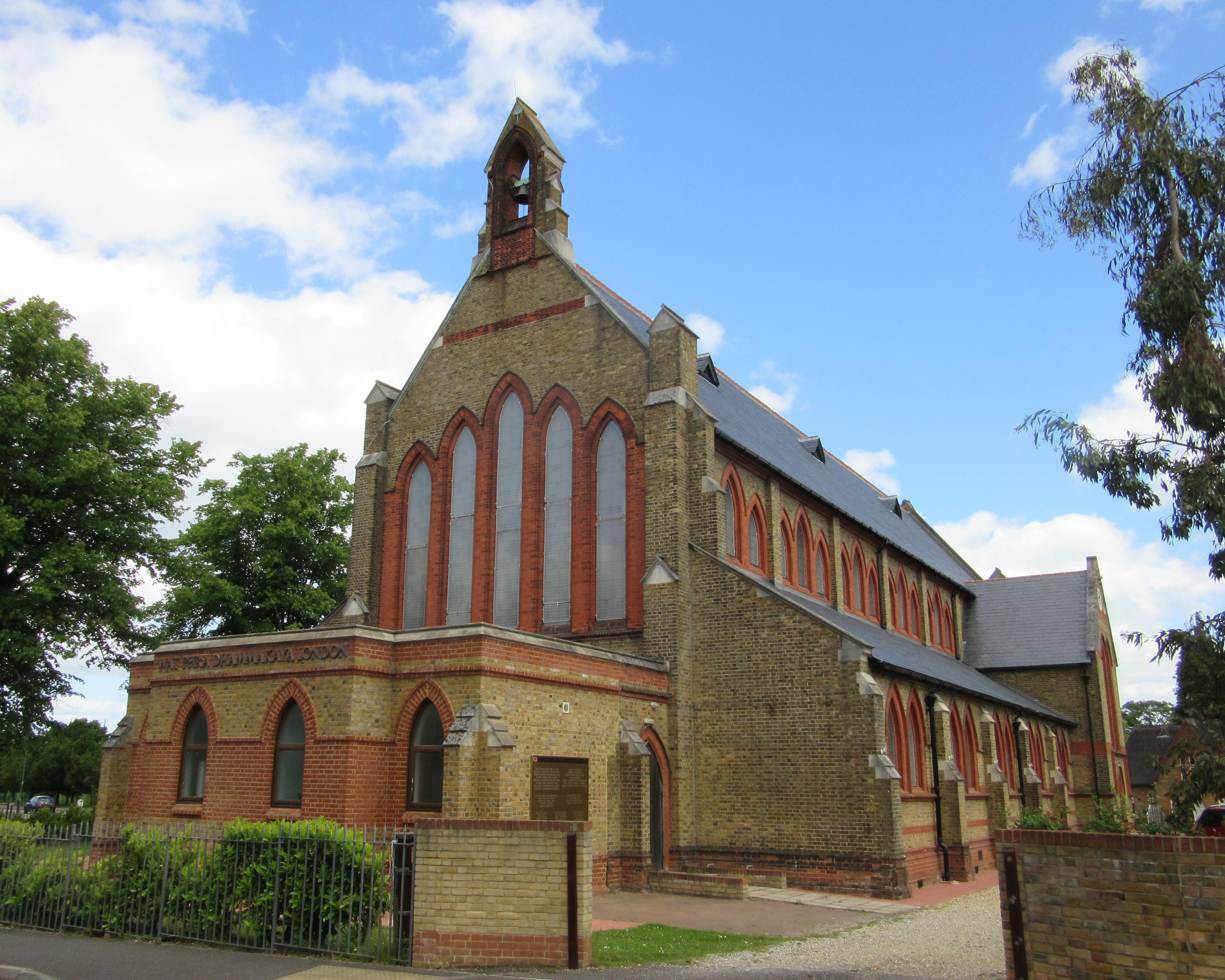
The chapel is now a Buddhist temple.

The facility, which was designed by Charles Henry Howell, the principal asylum architect in England and architect to the Lunacy Commissioners and county surveyor for Surrey from 1860–1893, was opened as the Brookwood Asylum on 17 June 1867. It was the leading mental hospital for the western half of Surrey, occupying a large site at Knaphill, near Brookwood. The hospital had a dairy farm, a cobbler's workshop, a large ballroom, its own fire brigade, gasworks and sewage farm and employed the services of many local businesses. The chapel, which could seat 800, opened in 1903. The facility became known as Brookwood Hospital in 1919.

During the Second World War the hospital served as an emergency war hospital and it joined the National Health Service in 1948. A library and conference centre were built in 1967.

It was occupied by staff protesting about staff shortages in 1982. Only 420 were in post out of an establishment of 805. It eventually closed in 1994.

Since the hospital's closure the land has been sold off for development for housing, and the clock tower and the central building around it, which is listed, has been converted into luxury apartments. Several of the new residential roads were named after the old hospital wards. The hospital's chapel is now a Buddhist temple and the former mortuary now provides living accommodation for the temple's monks. A large two-storey building that was originally the hospital's social club has been converted and registered as a children's day care centre and nursery.

== Brookwood Hospital Archive ==
In 2002 a grant from the Wellcome Trust's Research Resources in Medical History grant scheme allowed a comprehensive catalogue of the historic archive of Brookwood Hospital to be made. This catalogue has made the archive available to researchers as a source for medical, social and local historians.

The preserved archive is very extensive and provides a detailed overview of the day-to-day running of Brookwood Hospital and of the medical care provided to its patients throughout its history. The records also show how the hospital operated as a self-contained community, employing patients with skills in cooking, cleaning and gardening, providing training workshops, a 12-acre (49,000 m^{2}) farm which provided food for both the hospital and for sale, and details of the entertainment provided for the residents.
