= Daniel Harris (physiologist) =

Daniel Thomas Harris, BSC, MB, CHB, MD, DSC (24 May 1883-June 1981) was professor of physiology at the London Hospital Medical College from 1932 to 1948, when he retired and became an emeritus professor there.

He gained a B.SC. from the University of Wales, in 1903 and then had a lectured in applied mathematics and physics at the Hyde School of Technology, Manchester, until 1909. He graduated in Medicine the University of Manchester in 1914, and then remained there as senior lecture in physiology for a year. During the First World War he served as a surgical and medical officer in both England and France. After the war in 1919 he joined the Institute of Physiology at University College, London first as senior assistant and then as an assistant professor from 1921. In 1920 he was awarded a Beit Memorial Fellowships for Medical Research. In 1932 he became full professor of physiology at the London Hospital Medical College retaining emeritus professor status after his retirement.

== Publications ==
- (1934) Practical History for Medical Students 3rd edition, London : H. K. Lewis & Co.
