= Christ Church, Woking =

Christ Church
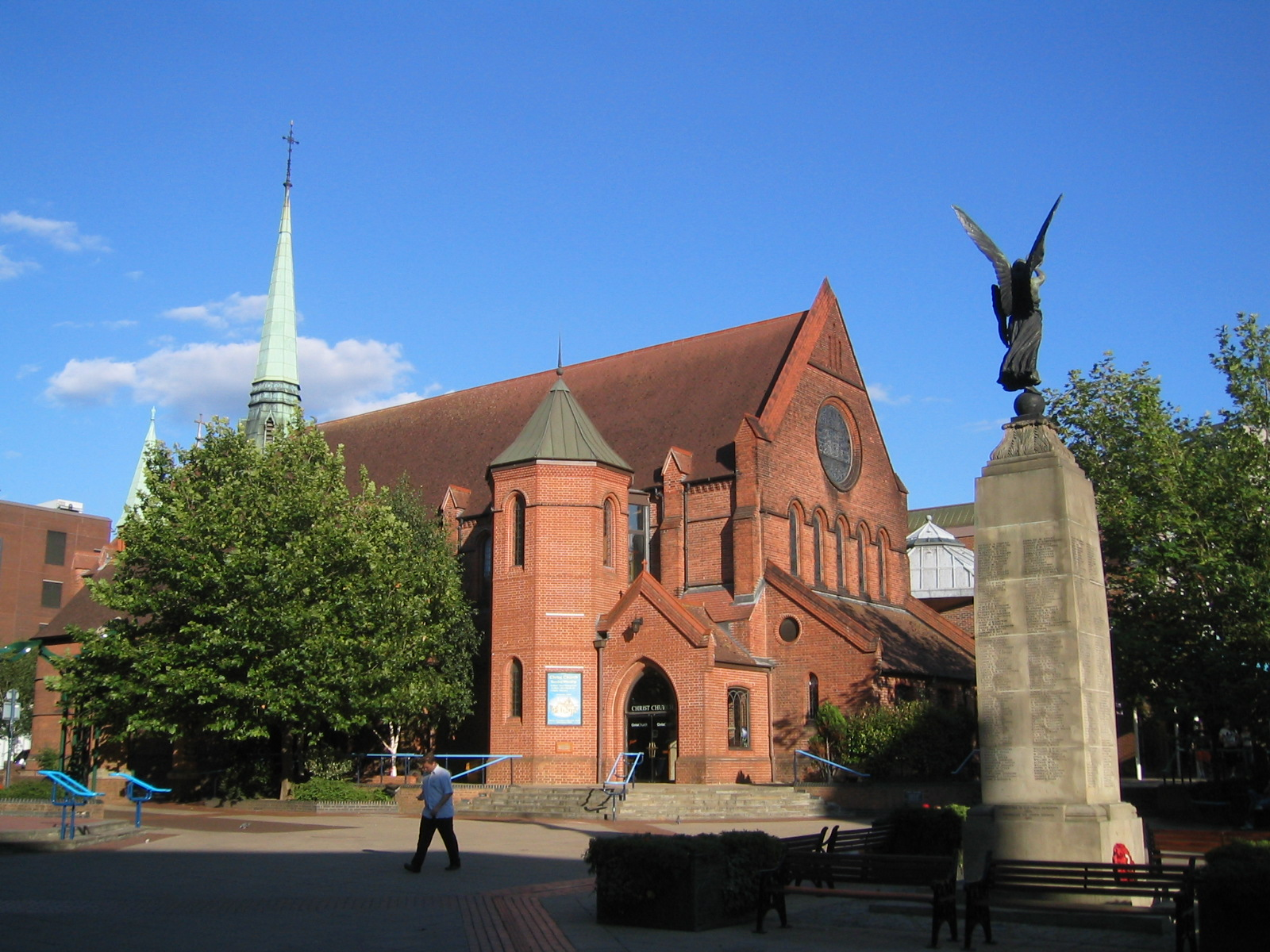
- Christ Church, Woking, with the town War Memorial in the foreground
- Christ Church
- 51°19′11.8″N 0°33′29.1″W
- Location: Jubilee Square, Woking, Surrey GU21 6YG
- Country: England
- Denomination: Church of England
- Website: Christ Church website

History
- Founded: 1887
- Consecrated: 14 June 1893

Architecture
- Functional status: Active
- Architect: W.F. Unsworth
- Architectural type: Gothic Revival
- Groundbreaking: 1887
- Completed: 1908

Administration
- Province: Canterbury
- Diocese: Guildford

Clergy
- Vicar: Adrian Beavis

Christ Church is located in Woking, England. The church is in the Diocese of Guildford.

== History ==
In the 1870s, Woking's population was growing rapidly. Services for the population were being held in the back room of a local shop, though the congregation was too large by 1877. A church hall known as the 'Iron Room' was constructed to accommodate for the growing congregation. The Iron Room was on the site of the current church. It could seat approximately 400 people.

The London Necropolis Railway had begun to sell off a lot of land, and a section of this was reserved "for a church, vicarage and burial ground". Furthermore, a plot of land had also been acquired in 1861 for the church (the Iron Room and modern church were built on this site).

On 11 February 1885, it was agreed a new church would be built and would cost between £4,000 and £5,000. The reason for this was because of overcrowding in the Iron Room.

Christ Church was started in 1887; the first stone was laid by the Duchess of Albany. The church held its first service on New Years Day 1889 and was completed in 1908 after the transepts and morning chapel were finished.

In recent years the church has undergone a series of developments, including the addition of a café and bookshop. In August 2026, renovation and expansion work began.
