= Mayford =

Village in Surrey, England

Coordinates: 51.2958°N 0.5673°W

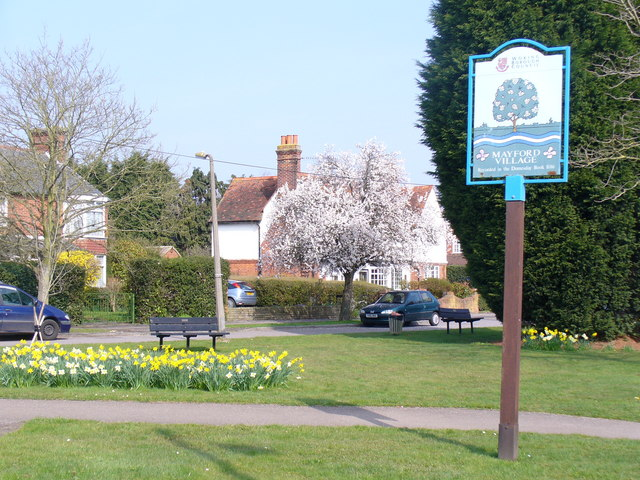
- Mayford village green

- Location within Surrey
- Population: 1,776 .
- OS grid reference: SU999561
- District: Woking
- Shire county: Surrey
- Region: South East
- Country: England
- Sovereign state: United Kingdom
- Post town: Woking
- Postcode district: GU22
- Dialling code: 01483
- Police: Surrey
- Fire: Surrey
- Ambulance: South East Coast
- UK Parliament: Woking

Mayford is a village in Woking borough of the county of Surrey, England. It is 3 miles south of Woking on Egley Road, part of the A320 between Woking and Guildford, Surrey. The village is mainly centred on the roundabout in the middle of the village. Mayford lays claim to having been mentioned in the Domesday Book in 1086, as "Maiford". The same spelling was recorded in 1212.

== Etymology ==
The name Mayford is supposed to be derived from the ford that used to cross the river Hoe. The 'May' part is believed to be short for mayweed, which grows around the River Hoe. Hawthorn trees were only called "May" from the 14th century onwards so this is unlikely to be the origin of the name.

== Wildlife ==
Mayford has a number of hawthorn trees growing in the area. It also has a lot of mayweed growing as well. A lot of the mayweed and hawthorn trees grow on the edge of the River Hoe.

== Bibliography ==
- Mayford Pond
