= Brookwood, Surrey =

Village in Surrey, England

Coordinates: 51°18′14″N 0°38′12″W

Brookwood
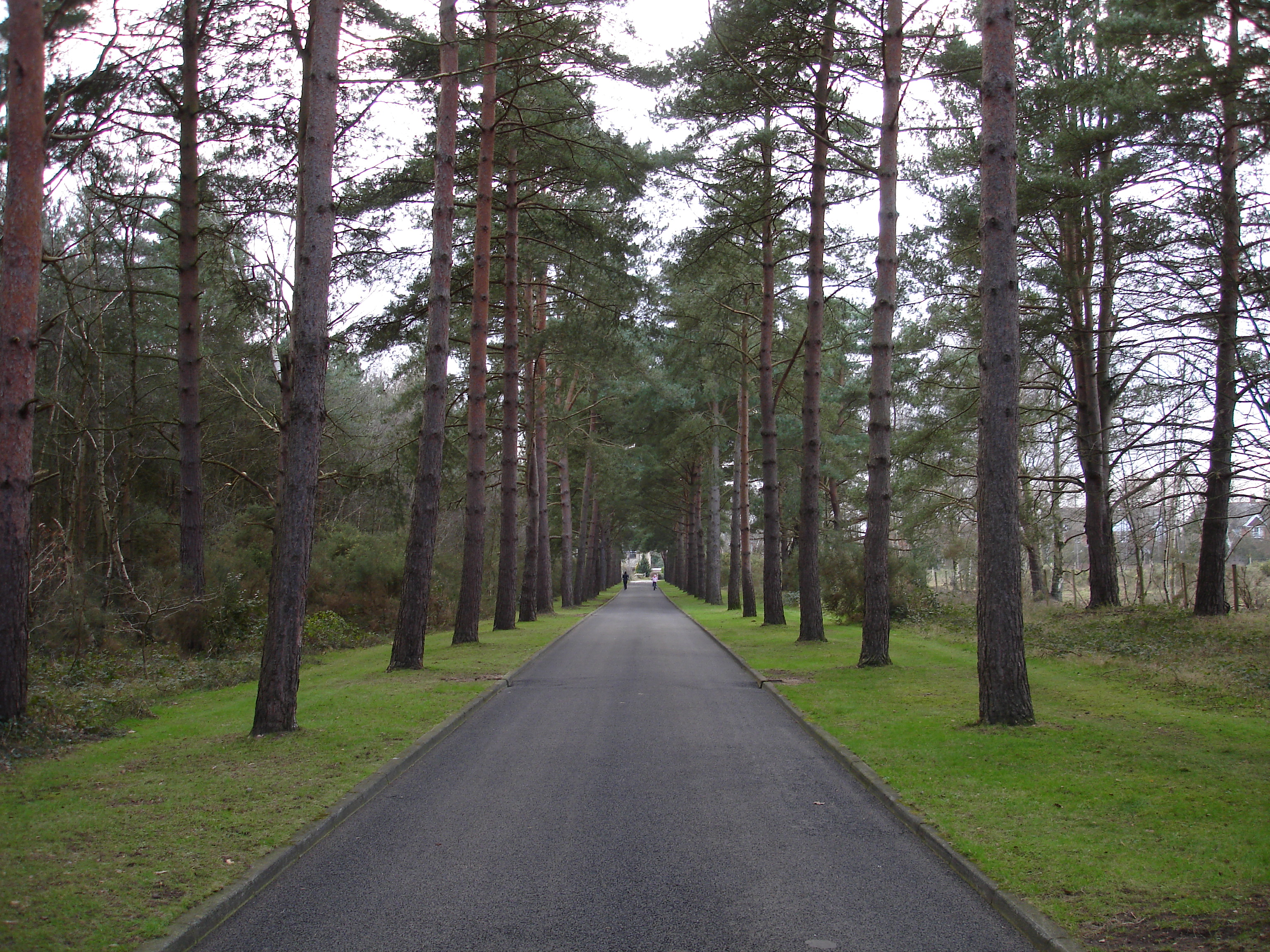
- The Avenue leading from Brookwood Cemetery

- Location within Surrey
- Population: 2,565 (2011. Ward)
- OS grid reference: SU952570
- District: Woking
- Shire county: Surrey
- Region: South East
- Country: England
- Sovereign state: United Kingdom
- Post town: Woking
- Postcode district: GU24
- Dialling code: 01483
- Police: Surrey
- Fire: Surrey
- Ambulance: South East Coast
- UK Parliament: Woking

Brookwood is a village in Surrey, England, about 3 1/2 miles (5.6 km) west of Woking, with a mixture of semi-rural, woodland-set and archetypal suburban residential homes. It lies on the western border of the Woking Borough, with a small part of the village in Guildford Borough. As part of the 2016 boundary review, Brookwood became part of the Heathlands ward which comprises Brookwood, Bridley, Hook Heath, Mayford, Sutton Green and Barnsbury and Wych Hill.

The village is known for the 500-acre Brookwood Cemetery, also called the London Necropolis. The village also gave its name to the former Victorian Brookwood Hospital, once the leading mental institution in Surrey. Since its closure in 1994, it has been redeveloped as housing.

== Geography ==
The village borders Knaphill, on the other side of the main A322 road, which is home to Brookwood Manor. The village also borders the Basingstoke Canal which has a flight of locks there. Pirbright Camp is a short distance to the west, with the decommissioned Princess Royal Barracks, Deepcut slightly further away to the west. The village is surrounded mainly by heathland such as Sheet's Heath, a Site of Special Scientific Interest, Smarts Heath and Brookwood Heath.

The main road is Connaught Road, a long road containing mixed Victorian terraces, a variety of 1930's semi-detached and larger detached houses. Branching off are smaller cul-de-sacs with more modern houses, some which back onto the canal itself. Along the road, there is a primary school which was established in 1906.

== History ==
Brookwood appears by name (as Brocwud and Brocwude) in the bounds of the Forest of Windsor as set down in 1225, and is depicted within 'Brookewood Walke' on John Norden's 1607 map of the Forest. It was mapped in detail for the first time in 1709, when it was recorded as covering 684 acres (excluding two large internal enclosures) bounded on all but the north-east side by Woking Common. Timber from Brookwood was used for the repair of local bridges in the late sixteenth and early seventeenth centuries, and by 1719 the wood appears to have been stripped of all trees.

The village has grown over the 150 or so years since the vast cemetery and station first set roots in this area. Many of London's dead were buried in Brookwood Cemetery during the Victorian era due to the over-population of the city at that time. The logistics were accomplished using the London Necropolis Railway, consisting of funeral trains running from London Waterloo railway station to Brookwood and subsequently down a small branch line into the cemetery grounds. This branch-line is now disused. The main station and nearby Brookwood Club private members bar are at least 100 years old.

The name, 'Brook wood', refers to the small streams which used to rise within it, and in particular to 'Coresbrook'. The name is unlikely to derive from 'brocc' (meaning 'badger'), although the animal features on the village crest and on the school uniform.

== Transport ==
Brookwood railway station is on the South West Main Line, with four trains per hour each way. The junction with the Alton Line is about 1 1/4 miles (2 km) further west. There is also a regular bus service to Guildford, Woking and Frimley.

== Sports teams and organisations ==
Brookwood has a football team, Brookwood and District Football Club. Formed in 2007, B & D FC currently play in the Surrey and Hants Border League Division 3. Last season 2009/10 they were winners of the Prince Albert Cup, beating Abbey Rangers 5-4 in the match at Surrey Sports Park.

=== Youth organisations ===
Brookwood is home to quite a number of youth organisations and clubs. Most of these meet at either the Memorial Hall, St Saviours Church or are based in the school.

Brookwood Scout Group meets in the Brookwood Memorial Hall every week during term time and offers both boys and girls between the ages of six and fourteen with the opportunity to take part in a wide range of activities and adventure. The group is a member of the Scout Association and covers the youngest three age bands that the Association caters for (Beavers, Cubs and Scouts).

=== Angling at Brookwood Country Park ===
Goldsworth Park Angling Club, established 2015, manages angling at Goldsworth Park Lake and Brookwood Ponds, under license with Woking Borough Council.

== See also ==
- St. Edward the Martyr Orthodox Church
- List of places of worship in Woking (borough)
