= Knaphill =

Village near Woking, Surrey, England

Coordinates: 51.319149°N 0.61663°W

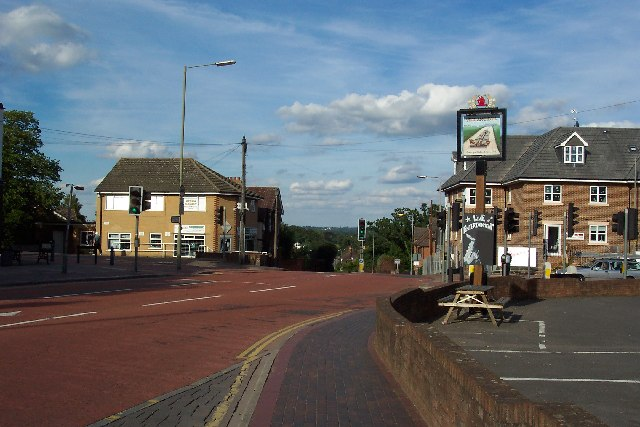
- Knaphill high street

- Location within Surrey
- Population: 8,635
- OS grid reference: SU965587
- District: Woking
- Shire county: Surrey
- Region: South East
- Country: England
- Sovereign state: United Kingdom
- Post town: Woking
- Postcode district: GU21
- Dialling code: 01483
- Police: Surrey
- Fire: Surrey
- Ambulance: South East Coast
- UK Parliament: Woking

Knaphill is a village in Surrey, England, between Woking to the east and Farnborough to the west; to the south and north on the A322 – its western border – are Brookwood, and Bisley. Some of the village is on a hill, hence its name.

== History ==
The village name was first recorded in 1225 as La Cnappe. Since then there have been various spellings of the name including Nap Hill, Naphill and Knap Hill.

In 958 A.D., the village was probably part of land granted to Westminster Abbey; there is clear ownership by 1278. The land passed to Henry VIII on the dissolution of the monasteries in the 1530s.

The Basingstoke Canal was built to the south of Knaphill in 1794 and the railway line came in 1838. In 1859, a prison was built in Knaphill. This was later converted into army barracks.

== Today ==
Knaphill has three schools: Knaphill Lower School, Knaphill Junior School and St John's Primary School.

Theatre company Peer Productions is based at the Woking Youth Arts Centre in Knaphill, providing drama training and workshops for students of all ages. WYAC was previously known as Trinity Studios, and is famous as being the birthplace of the Spice Girls and the boy band 5ive

Local pubs include The Garibaldi, The Nags Head, The Royal Oak, which dates back to the 17th century, The Anchor, formerly a hotel and now closed, and Crown Inn, on the high street. The village has a residents' association. The nearest railway stations are at Brookwood and at Woking.

== Sport and leisure ==
Knaphill has a Non-League football club, Knaphill F.C., who play at Redding Way, the Brookwood Country Park football ground and are members of the Combined Counties Football League.

Knaphill Cricket Club plays at Waterers Park and was established in 2015. The club welcomes people aged 16+ of all abilities. Knaphill had a Men's team till the early 1990s and a new team was formed in 2015. Until the late 1930s, Knaphill also had a women's team.

Knaphill is home to Mizens Railway, a 7 1/4 in gauge railway run by volunteer members of the Woking Miniature Railway Society (WRMS). It is open most summer Sundays from 2pm until 5pm.

== Brookwood Hospital ==
One of the major employers in the area until its closure in 1994 was Brookwood Hospital, a vast, rambling mental hospital, that dated from the late Victorian era. Built on land formerly known as Knaphill Common, the hospital started life as The Surrey Asylum and formed part of the southern boundary of Knaphill (being denoted by the Basingstoke Canal).

Its name was changed to Brookwood Hospital in 1919 to make it easier for patients and visitors travelling by rail to Brookwood Station to locate. Most of the hospital grounds have now been redeveloped, the wards having made way for several superstores and a large number of houses. The central building, which is listed, has been retained and converted into luxury flats. Several of the new residential roads were named after the old hospital wards.

== Inkerman Barracks ==
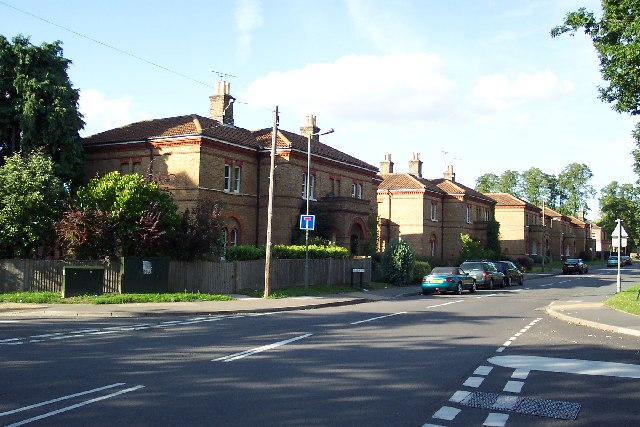
Surviving housing (originally built for prison officers) on Raglan Terrace.

In 1859 the Home Office began constructing a prison for disabled convicts on a 65-acre site in Knaphill. In 1892 the prison was converted for use by infantry battalions and became known as Inkerman Barracks. In the 1970s, however, the site was sold to Woking Borough Council and comprehensive demolition followed; a couple of terraces of houses are all that remain today.

== See also ==
- List of places of worship in Woking (borough)
