= Woking (disambiguation) =

Woking is a large town and borough in Surrey, England.

Woking may also refer to:

- Woking, Alberta, a small hamlet in Alberta, Canada
- Woking Hundred, a hundred in what is now Surrey, England
- Woking (constituency), a UK constituency represented in the House of Commons
- Woking railway station, a railway station serving Woking, Surrey, England
- Woking F.C., a football club from Woking, Surrey, England
- Old Woking, a former village now considered part of the town of Woking, Surrey, England
- Woking College, a Sixth Form College situated in Woking, Surrey, England
- Woking High School, a high school in Woking, Surrey, England

== See also ==
- Wokingham, a market town in Berkshire, England
