= Bip Pares =

English illustrator (1904–1977)

- Born: Ethel Pares; 27 February 1904; Clewer
- Died: February 4, 1977 (aged 72); Hampstead
- Occupations: Commercial artist, illustrator

Ethel "Bip" Pares (27 February 1904 – 4 February 1977) was an Art Deco illustrator and cartographer, who designed at least 600 book covers, created iconic posters for London Transport and wrote and illustrated an account of her honeymoon in the Himalayas. Her covers for British books were often retained for American publications, which was unusual practice at the time.

== Early life and education ==
Ethel Pares was born on 27 February 1904 in Clewer, near Windsor, Berkshire, the second of six children. Her parents were Caroline "Eve" Evelyn née Whistler (1874–1959) and Basil Pares (1869–1943) who had married in 1902 in Norfolk. Her father was a surgeon-major of the Royal Horse Guards by 1906 and was mentioned twice in despatches in the First World War. Her siblings were George Pares (later a Commander in the Royal Navy), Evelyn, Stephen, Basil and Constance (known as Kon) who also became an artist. One of her paternal uncles was historian Bernard Pares, known for his work on Russia and a first cousin was plantswoman and photographer Susan Jellicoe.

Named after a paternal aunt, Ethel was widely known as "Bip", her family's pet name for her (inspired by her inability to pronounce a horse's name when a small child). Bip became the name she used professionally, even on official documents.

Pares studied at the Slade School of Art in the early 1920s.

== Career ==
Pares developed a successful career working as a commercial artist. She produced posters for London Transport, Underground Group, and London Transport between 1928 and 1939 while working at the Clement Dane Studio.

She was an illustrator of numerous books and is thought to have produced at least 600 dust jackets designs for published books, particularly crime novels. Notable cover illustrations included Woman Alive by Susan Ertz (1935); Wigs of the Green by Nancy Mitford (1935); Star Maker by Olaf Stapledon (1937); Fair Fat Lady (1937) by Noel de Vic Beamish, Living with History by Ernest Henry Short (1939) and Good-bye, Mr. Chips by James Hilton (1933). In 1934 she produced a cover design for the Electrical Handbook for Women, written by Caroline Haslett and published by the Electrical Association for Women. The cover was used for five editions of the book across two decades.

She created maps for the Daily Express during the Second World War having been recorded as enrolled in the Air Ministry ARP Camouflage in the 1939 Register. Pares continues to work as a cartographer into the 1950s with her work published by the Sunday Observer and reproduced in the Sunday Herald in Australia.

She is best known for her commercial British art-deco style, although did also work in more naturalistic designs. The cover designs she created for British editions of books were often retained for the American editions, too, a rarity at the time she was working. Her work is now considered very collectible.

Her later career was affected by ill health, but she continued to work in illustration, even when unable to leave her bed. Some of her later work was illustrations for greeting cards.

== Personal life ==
On 30 September 1933, Pares married Alfred Trevor Gwyn Thomas, a physician, at St Mary the Virgin, in Horsell Surrey. Her uncle, Norman Pares, was the parish vicar and conducted the ceremony.

The marriage was short-lived, and she petitioned for divorce in 1936. She then shared her flat with Eric Vernon Francis, a writer on politics and economics, and Frederick Elwyn Jones, later Baron Elwyn-Jones, the Welsh barrister and Labour politician.

In 1938, Pares married for a second time, to Robert Christopher Bradby (1905–1982), son of Henry Christopher Bradby (1868–1947), a poet and master at Rugby School. The couple spent their honeymoon in the Himalayas, travelling with the British Everest Expedition which set out that year under Bill Tilman. Pares later published an account of the journey in 1940, writing and illustrating the book called Himalayan Honeymoon, published by Hodder & Stoughton, for whom she often worked as an illustrator. The couple settled in Hampstead, and had one son Bonamy P. Bradby born in 1941, but by 1948 the marriage was over.

Pares lived in Hampstead until her death on 4 February 1977. A memorial service was held in her honour at St Luke's Church, Hampstead on 12 February 1977.

== Legacy ==
A number of the posters Pares designed for London Transport are held in the collections of London Transport Museum.
