= Will Forster =

British politician (born 1986)

Will Forster MP
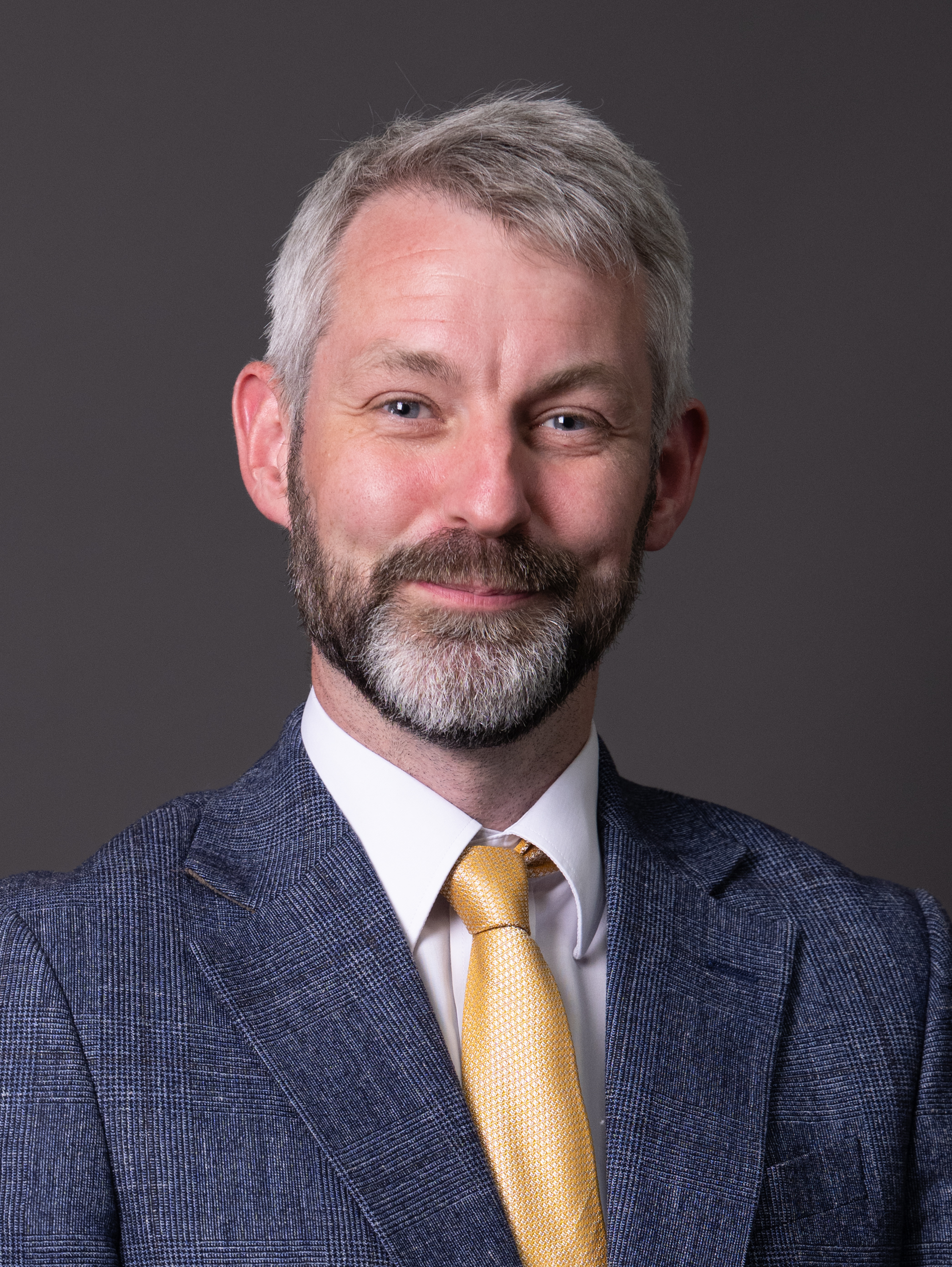
- Official portrait, 2026

Member of Parliament for Woking
- Incumbent
- Assumed office 4 July 2024
- Preceded by: Jonathan Lord
- Majority: 11,246 (23.4%)

Liberal Democrat portfolios
- 2025–2026: Immigration and Asylum
- 2026-present: Deputy Chief Whip

Mayor of Woking
- In office 17 May 2018 – 16 May 2019
- Preceded by: Graham Cundy
- Succeeded by: Beryl Hunwicks

Personal details
- Born: 14 August 1986 (age 40) Woking, Surrey, England
- Party: Liberal Democrats
- Education: Woking High School; Woking College
- Alma mater: University of Leicester (LLB)

William Paul Forster (born 14 August 1986) is a British Liberal Democrat politician who has served as Member of Parliament (MP) for Woking since 2024.

== Early life ==
Forster grew up in Goldsworth Park and Horsell. He attended Horsell Church of England Junior School, Woking High School, and Woking College.

== Political career ==
Forster served as a councillor for Woking South on Surrey County Council continuously from 2009 until standing down in July 2025, following his election as Woking's MP.

He served as a councillor for Kingfield and Westfield on Woking Borough Council from 2011 until the seat was renamed Hoe Valley in 2016. Forster continued to serve as a councillor for Hoe Valley from 2016 until standing down in July 2025.

From 2018 to 2019, Forster served as Mayor of Woking.

Between May 2022 and July 2024, Forster worked for the Liberal Democrats as a Campaign Manager for the South East, stepping down to pursue his successful parliamentary election campaign.

At the July 2024 United Kingdom general election, Forster defeated the incumbent Conservative to become Woking's first Liberal Democrat MP.

On Thursday 10 October 2024, Forster held his first adjournment debate in parliament to look at the rising cost of rail fares. Forster labelled rail travel as a luxury that many can no longer afford and called on the Government to implement a freeze on rail fares, stating that commuters are "ironically risking debt to make a living."

Forster joined the Housing, Communities and Local Government Committee on 28 October 2024 and was appointed as the Liberal Democrat Spokesperson for Immigration and Asylum on October 1, 2025.

In early 2025, Forster established and chaired the inaugural meeting of the All-Party Parliamentary Group (APPG) on South Western Railway (SWR). The cross-party group was created to examine issues relating to rail services, infrastructure and passenger experience on the South Western Railway network. Forster serves as the APPG's Chair and Registered Contact.

The tragic 2023 Murder of Sara Sharif from Woking led Forster to make protecting vulnerable children a key priority of his Parliamentary work. During the 10 week trial and sentencing of her father, Urfan Sharif, and stepmother, Beinash Batool, in late 2024 the jury heard Sara was subjected to a “campaign of abuse”. Speaking in the House of Commons on 18th December 2024, Forster asked the Prime Minister what steps the Government was taking to ensure that other children would not suffer Sara’s fate and requested an urgent, independent inquest.

Speaking in a November 2025 Westminster Hall debate on Protecting Children from Domestic Abuse, Forster called for the Government act on and implement the 15 local and national recommendations set out in Sara Sharif Safeguarding Review. On Wednesday 28 January 2026, Forster held a Westminster Hall debate on Local Authority Children’s Services, in which he called for improvements to funding, information standards and training Forster also called for the implementation of a national homeschool register "to ensure that we know where the hundreds of homeschooled children across the country are and that they are safe" and demanded that Surrey County Council's children services be placed in special measures.

== Personal life ==
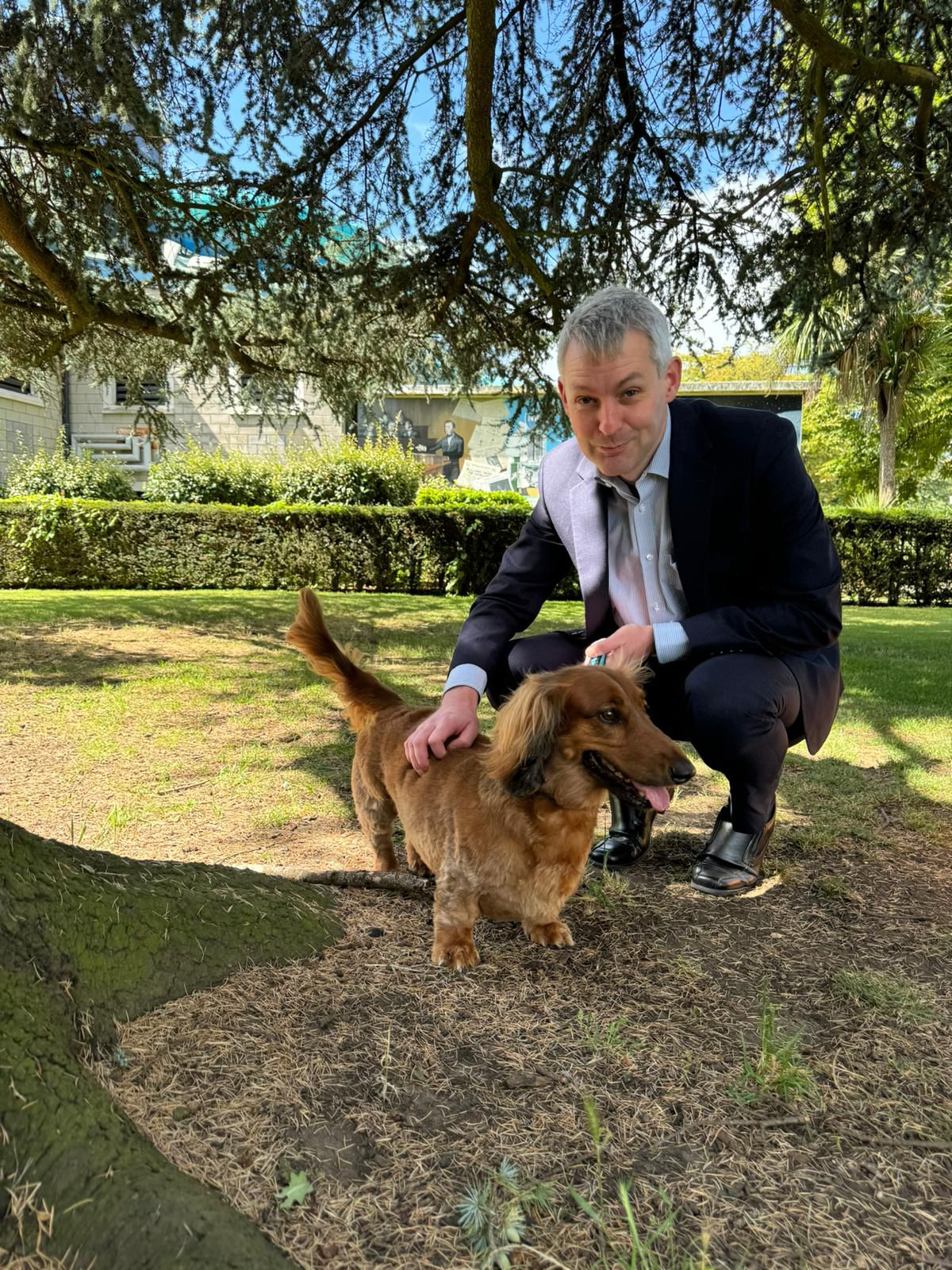
Forster and his dog, Toffee

Forster previously lived in Westfield, and now lives near Woking Park with his long-haired dachshund, Toffee.

Parliament of the United Kingdom
Preceded by Jonathan Lord	Member of Parliament for Woking; 2024–present	Incumbent
