= Norman Pares =

English Anglican priest and amateur footballer (1857–1936)

Canon Rev. Norman Pares (16 June 1857 – 23 June 1936) was an English canon and amateur footballer who was on the winning side in the 1879 FA Cup Final.

== Family ==
Pares was born at the family home at 12 Devonshire Gardens, Portland Place, London, the eldest son of John Pares (1833–1915) and Katharine (née Back). His father was the son of Thomas Pares (1790–1866), who was M.P. for Leicester from 1818 to 1826. His mother was the sister of Admiral Sir George Back FRS (1796–1878), the explorer and naturalist.

Pares was one of ten children of the marriage between John Pares and Katharine; he had four brothers (George (Lancelot), Bernard, Basil and Howard) and five sisters (Alice, Ethel, Margaret, Constance and May).

His brother, Bernard (1867–1949), was a historian and academic known for his work on Russia.

On 22 August 1888, he married Beatrice Emma, daughter of William Ireland Blackburne.

== Career ==
Pares was educated at Eton College before attending Trinity College, Cambridge in 1876, where he read Classics, graduating with a Third Class Honours degree in 1880, before gaining his M.A. in 1883.

He was ordained deacon in 1885, becoming a priest in 1886. From 1881 to 1897, he was a teacher at Portsmouth Grammar School, becoming second master in 1892. He was curate at St. Jude's, Southsea from 1885 to 1887, and then at Portsmouth Parish Church from 1894 to 1897.

In 1897, he left Portsmouth and became vicar at St Mary the Virgin, Horsell, near Woking, Surrey where he remained until shortly before he died. He officiated at the marriage of his niece, the illustrator and artist Ethel "Bip" Pares at the church in 1933. From 1913 to 1928, he was Rural Dean for Woking and was a canon at Winchester from 1925 to 1927 and at Guildford from 1928 until his death on 23 June 1936.

While vicar at Horsell, he helped the village acquire the land on which the village hall was built in 1906–07 and served for many years on the board of trustees. He was also president of the village cricket team. Pares Close, near the church, was named after him.

== Football career ==
Whilst at Eton, he represented the school at football and continued to play football while at Cambridge University. While at University, he played for Old Etonians and was a member of the old boys' team that defeated Clapham Rovers in the 1879 FA Cup Final, playing at inside-left in a 1–0 victory.

While living in Portsmouth, he founded the Portsmouth Sunflowers Football Club. In 1886, they entered the South Hants & Dorset Senior Cup, where they were defeated 6–1 by Woolston Works on 9 October 1886. The Sunflowers included two of his brothers and at least one cousin at various times, as well as colleagues from Portsmouth Grammar School and former colleagues at Eton and Cambridge.

== Other sports ==
At Eton, he also played the Eton Field Game. He was also a cricketer, and a member of the M.C.C. and a keen golfer and cyclist.

== Bibliography ==
- Juson, Dave; Bull, David (2001). Full-Time at The Dell. Hagiology Publishing. ISBN 0-9534474-2-1.
- Warsop, Keith (2004). The Early FA Cup Finals and the Southern Amateurs. SoccerData. ISBN 1-899468-78-1.
