= Bernard Pares =

British historian and diplomat (1867–1949)

Sir Bernard Pares KBE
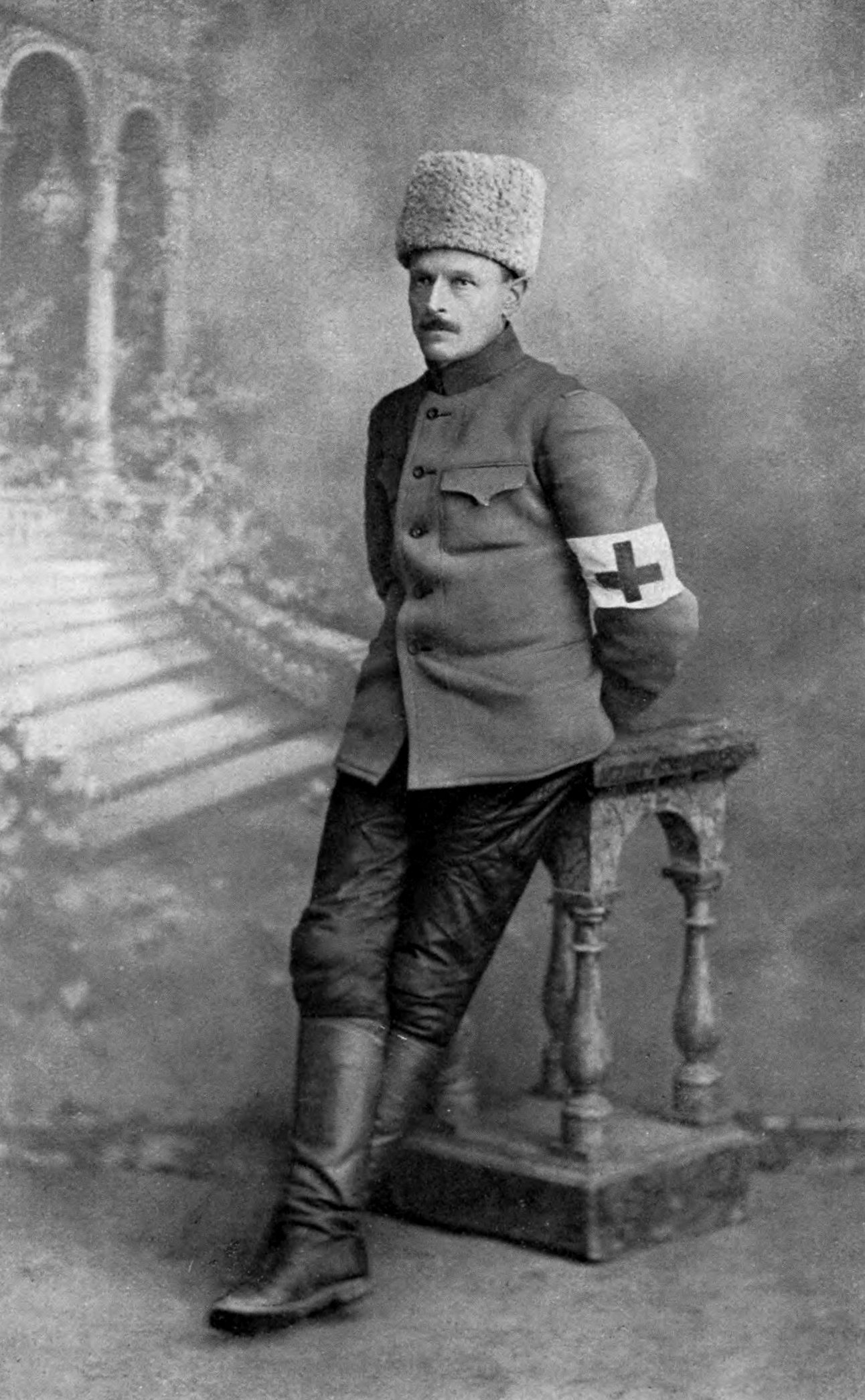
- Pares in Russia during World War I
- Born: 1 March 1867; Albury, Surrey, England
- Died: 17 April 1949 (aged 82); New York City, U.S.
- Occupations: Historian; diplomat
- Known for: His work on Russian history and literature
- Relatives: George Back (uncle)

Sir Bernard Pares KBE (1 March 1867 – 17 April 1949) was an English historian and diplomat. During the First World War, he was seconded to the Foreign Ministry in Petrograd, Russia, where he reported political events back to London, and worked in propaganda. He returned to London as professor of Russian history. He is best known for his numerous books on Russia, especially his standard textbook, A History of Russia (1926), which had highly detailed coverage of the revolutionary era. He was a very active public speaker in the 1940s in support of Stalin's Soviet Union.

== Early life and family ==
Bernard Pares was one of ten children of the marriage between Katharine (née Back) and John Pares; he had four brothers (George (Lancelot), Norman, Basil and Howard) and five sisters (Alice, Ethel, Margaret, Constance and May). His father was the son of Thomas Pares (1790–1866), who was M.P. for Leicester from 1818 to 1826. His mother was the sister of Admiral Sir George Back FRS (1796–1878), the explorer and naturalist. They were a wealthy family, and he inherited a large sum that enabled him to live comfortably despite low academic salaries.

Pares was educated at Harrow School and Trinity College, Cambridge, where he graduated in Classics taking a third. He worked over the next ten years as a school teacher spending his vacations touring the main battlefields of the Napoleonic Wars.

He married Margaret Ellis, daughter of Edward Austin Dixon, a dental surgeon in Colchester. They had three sons, Peter (who became a diplomat), Andrew (who became a soldier) and Richard (a historian), and two daughters, Elizabeth, who was Head of the Foreign Research and Press Service, Baltic Section at Chatham House during WWII and Ursula (Susan), who married Sir Geoffrey Jellicoe, the landscape architect, becoming an eminent plantswoman and photographer in her own right. His niece through his brother Basil was the artist and illustrator Bip Pares.

== Russia ==
Pares first visited Russia in 1898; at about the same time as he was appointed a university extension lecturer in Cambridge. In 1906, he attended the first duma at the Taurida Palace in Saint Petersburg and took note on how little the British officers attending could understand the political situation in Russia at the time. Viewing the study of Russian as less of a scholarly pursuit than an urgent political necessity, he founded the first School of Russian Studies in Britain at the University of Liverpool in 1907.

In 1908, Pares was promoted to Professor of Russian History, Language, and Literature at the University of Liverpool, which he held until 1917 when he became Professor of Russian at the university's School of Slavonic Studies. In 1909, he organised the visit to Great Britain of a delegation of the Third Duma on which occasion he was presented with a silver punch bowl and salver with eighteen goblets. Reputed to be the products of the Faberge workshop, these are currently on display in the foyer of the School of Slavonic and East European Studies building at University College London.

== World War I ==
With the outbreak of World War I, Pares was appointed official observer to the Russian army and later seconded to the staff of the British Embassy in Petrograd. Pares set his hopes for Russia with the Provisional Government and, after the Bolshevik revolution, moved to Siberia to support Alexander Kolchak's army where he gave frequent lectures to the White troops. He was awarded a KBE for his services to British relations with Russia in 1919, but until 1935 he was banned by the new communist government from re-entering Russia.

== Later life and death ==
Pares was not so much a scholar, but proved an organizer and public speaker — skills he put to use after 1919 when he moved to the recently founded School of Slavonic and East European Studies, then a part of King's College London, University of London.

He became Professor of Russian Language, Literature and History, editor of the Slavonic Review (later Slavonic and East European Review) and Director of the School. As Director, Pares successfully negotiated the School's re-establishment as an independent institute of the University and its move to the North Wing of the University's new Senate House in Bloomsbury. Pares continued to write on Russian history and literature, publishing most notably his History of Russia (1926 and subsequent editions).

In 1939, Pares retired as Director, subsequently acting as an adviser to the wartime government on Russian affairs, taking a favourable attitude toward Stalin, while deploring some of his excesses. He was very active in public speeches across Britain on behalf of the Soviet alliance with Britain in opposition to Nazi Germany.

He moved to New York in 1942 where, shortly after completing his autobiography, he died.

== Legacy ==
In 2008, the established chair of Russian history at the (now) UCL School of Slavonic and East European Studies was renamed the Sir Bernard Pares Chair in Russian History. The established chair had, after Pares, been held by Hugh Seton-Watson and Geoffrey Hosking. The first holder of the reinaugurated and newly named chair is Professor Simon Dixon, formerly of the University of Leeds.

== Notes ==
=== Published works ===
- Russia and Reform, London: Constable, 1907. from Archive.org
- Day by Day with the Russian Army, 1914–15, London: Constable, 1915. from Archive.org
- The League of Nations and Other Questions of Peace, London: Hodder and Stoughton, 1919.
- A History of Russia, New York: Alfred Knopf, 1926.
- My Russian Memoirs, London: Jonathan Cape, 1931.
- Moscow Admits a Critic, London and New York: T. Nelson, 1936.
- The Fall of the Russian Monarchy, London: Jonathan Cape; New York: Alfred Knopf, 1939.
- Russia and the Peace, New York: Macmillan, 1945.
- A Wandering Student, Ithaca, NY: Syracuse University Press, 1948.
