= Annie O'Meara de Vic Beamish =

Irish author (1883-1969)

- Born: Anne O'Meara Beamish; 30 April 1883; Dublin, Ireland
- Died: 1 August 1969 (aged 86); Switzerland

Annie O'Meara de Vic Beamish (30 April 1883 – 1 August 1969), was an Irish writer, translator and playwright.

== Life ==
Beamish was the daughter of Reverend Franck John de Vic Beamish and Ann S. Greenfield. She was born April 30, 1883, in Dublin, Ireland, and was educated at home through governesses and tutors. She wrote under the names John Bernard and Noel de Vic Beamish. She wrote and translated for the stage. Beamish also founded various language schools in Europe and worked in the Berlitz school in Cannes teaching English.

She was a friend and neighbour of Samuel Beckett in Roussillon during the Second World War. She is the origin of the character "Old Miss McGlone" and appears as a character with Beckett in A Country Road, A Tree by Jo Baker. She lived at the time with a companion Suzanne Allévy and they were understood to be a couple. Beamish was considered a local character. She wore men's clothing, went by the name Noel and used a monocle for reading. She also taught English to the painter Henri Hayden while he was staying in the village. There were rumours she was involved with the British secret service or a member of Beckett's resistance cell. Certainly however she was supportive to the Jewish refugees who fled to the area. Beamish died in Switzerland, 1 August 1969.

== Publications ==
- Tweet | H. Jenkins Limited | 1927
- The Grafting of the Rose
- The King's Missal. H. Jenkins, Limited. 1934.
- Miss Perfection: The Story of an Airedale Terrier. Hutchinson. 1931.
- The Queen's Jester. London. 1969.
- Beatrice in Babel
- The Quest of Love
- Venetian Lady
- The Blooming of the Rose
- Fair Fat Lady (Ivor Nicholson and Watson; (1937), first edition dust jacket illustrated by Bip Pares priced 7s. 6d. Plot summary from The Bulletin review "The tragedy of a fat girl. She falls in love with the tenor of a concert party, discovers him in an infidelity, joins a Continental circus as fat woman, adopts the tenor’s illegitimate son (who is ashamed of her fat), discovers a gift for finance, returns home and becomes the millionaire philanthropist of her native town, cannot find happiness, but keeps a kind heart through it all.
- Lady Beyond the Walls
- Shadows of Splendour
- The Sword of Love
- The Sign of the Beast
- The New Race of Devils
- A Woman of Fire (1923)
