= List of mayors of Woking =

The Mayor of Woking are listed below.

== Chairmen of Woking Urban District Council ==
#	Year	Name
1	1895	Gustav Friedrich Wermig
2	1898	George Harris
3	1903	William Burne
4	1904	Henry William Gloster
5	1905	Patrick Herbert White
6	1909	Sparkes Cornelius Knight
7	1910	William Aird
8	1911	James Hutchinson Driver
9	1913	Henry Alfred Whitburn
10	1914	Albert Hamilton Godfrey
11	1920	Harry Trevor Wilson
12	1921	Albert Broderick
13	1922	Frederick Rice
14	1923	Alfred Hardy
15	1924	Philip Warren
16	1925	Henry Quartermaine
17	1926	William Harker
18	1927	Walter Mathews, Lt. Colonel
19	1928	Albert Foord
20	1929	Seymour Price-Williams
21	1930	Henry Quartermaine
22	1932	Arthur Campbell
23	1934	Philip Easton Lt. Col.
24	1936	??
25	1938	Conrad Samuel
26	1941	Frederick Sowden
27	1943	Edgar Cook
28	1944	Harry Herbert
29	1945	Charles May
30	1946	Henry Cawsey
31	1947	Graham Wilson Capt.
32	1948	Bertram Ralph-Brown
33	1949	Guy Pritchett
34	1950	Harold Rett
35	1951	Thomas Leam
36	1952	Gerald Colpoys, Captain
37	1953	Walter Darby
38	1954	Robert Beldam
39	1955	James Terry
40	1956	Arthur Campbell
41	1957	Frederick Sowden
42	1958	Leslie Cheeseman
43	1959	Stanley Higgins
44	1960	Dorothy Gale
45	1961	Thomas Leam
46	1962	Marjorie Richardson
47	1963	Rhoda McGaw
48	1964	Victor Pearmund
49	1965	Thomas Leam
50	1966	Benard Robinson, Commander
51	1967	Ivor Gibson
52	1968	Bernard Emmett
53	1969	Eric Bucksey
54	1970	Margaret Marshall
55	1971	David Boorman
56	1972	Harry Keat
57	1973	David Robinson

== Mayors of Woking Borough Council ==
Source: Woking Council

#	Year	Name
1	1974	Christopher Mitchell
2	1975	Terry Molloy
3	1976	Ian McCallum
4	1977	Anthony Allenby
5	1978	Gordon Brown
6	1979	William Greenwood
7	1980	Margaret Gammon
8	1981	Francis Spanton
9	1982	Dorothy Butler
10	1983	Paul Blagbrough
11	1984	John Jewson
12	1985	Patricia Bohling
13	1986	Anne Payne
14	1987	Margaret Gammon
15	1988	Alexander Grayson
16	1989	Anne Cartwright
17	1990	Rhodney Lofting
18	1991	Richard Williams
19	1992	Leslie Pescodd
20	1993	Rosie Sharpley
21	1994	David Thornton
22	1995	Neville Hinks
23	1996	John Coombe
24	1997	Irene Matthews
25	1998	Rosemary Johnson
26	1999	Ian Fidler
27	2000	Ian Eastwood
28	2001	Barry Pope
29	2002	Mehala Gosling
30	2003	Richard Sanderson
31	2004	Graham Cundy
32	2005	Ian Johnson
33	2006	John Kingsbury
34	2007	Bryan K. Cross
35	2008	Peter W. Ankers
36	2009	Christina J Liddington
37	2010	Mohammed Iqbal
38	2011	Ken Howard
39	2012	Michael J Smith
40	2013	Anne E Roberts
41	2014	Tony Branaghan
42	2015	Derek McCrum
43	2016	Anne E Murray
44	2017	Graham S Cundy
45	2018	Will Forster
46	2019	Beryl Hunwicks
47	2021	Liam Lyons
48	2022	Saj Hussain
49	2023	M Ilyas Raja
50	2024	Louise Morales
51	2025	Amanda Boote
