= Woking College =

Sixth form college in Woking, England

Coordinates: 51.307°N 0.548°W

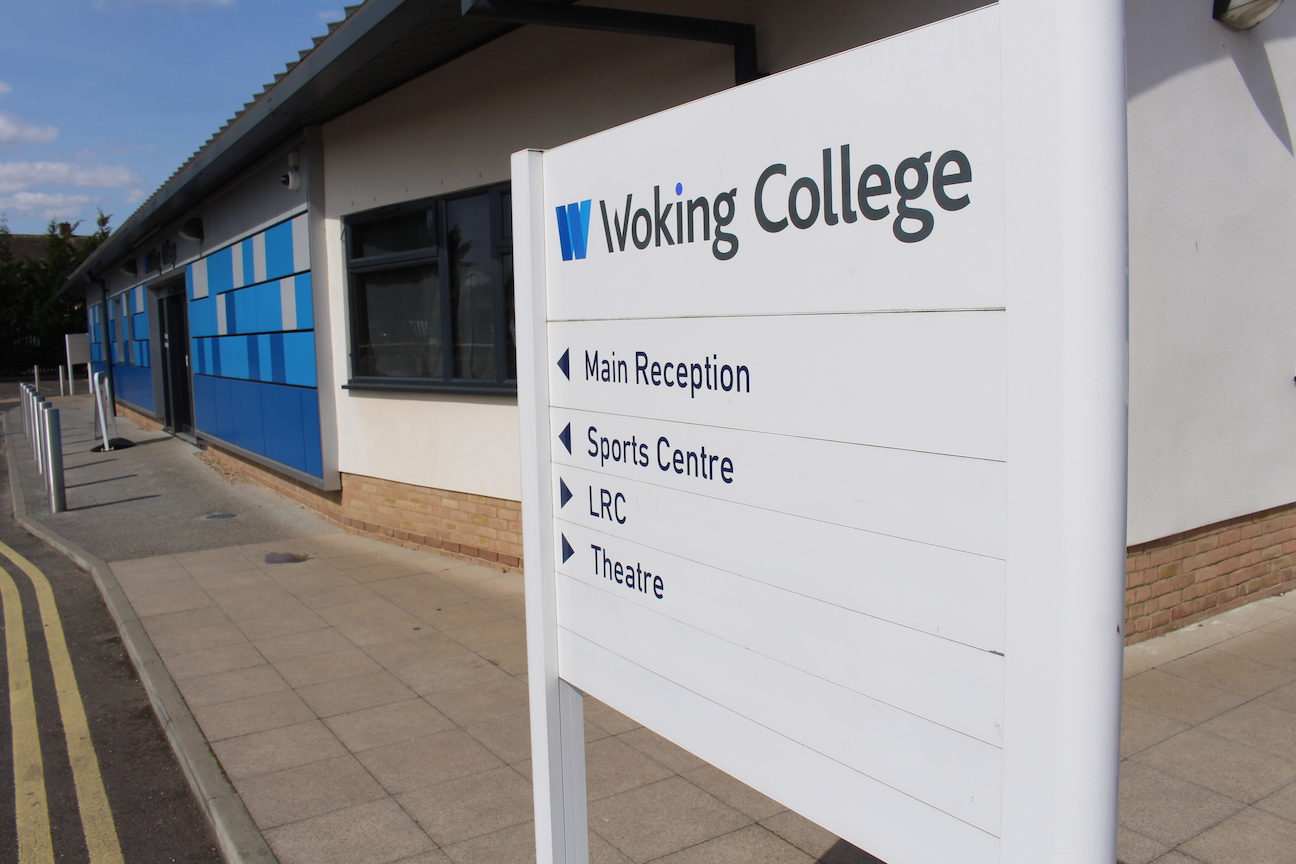

Information
- School type: Sixth form college
- Ofsted: Reports
- Age: 16 to 19
- Enrollment: c.1,700
- Website: woking.ac.uk

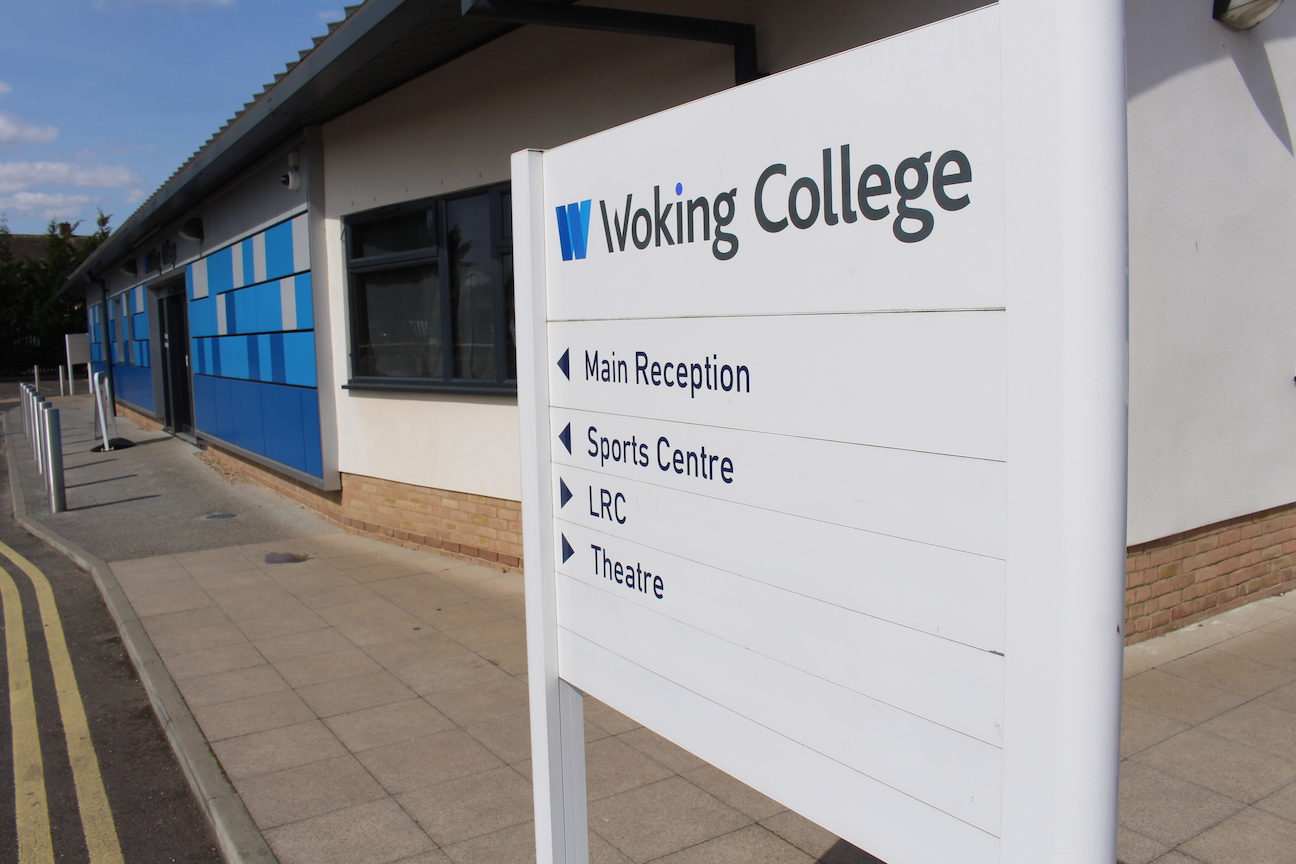
Main reception area

Woking College is a sixth form college in Woking, Surrey, with over 1,700 16-19-year-olds studying A Levels and advanced vocational courses. It was the first purpose-built sixth-form college in Surrey and the first buildings were designed by Raymond Ash.

The college attracts students from over 50 schools. For students who need to top up their GCSE grades there are courses in English, maths and biology.

Facilities include a sports centre, gym and playing fields, a 140-seat theatre and dance studio, an arts block, and a science building.

== History ==
The College was opened in 1977. At the same time Woking County Grammar School for Boys (which was Woking County School for Boys until 1946) and Woking County Grammar School for Girls (previously named Woking County Secondary School for Girls) were both closed. For the first few years after the College opened the buildings of the Boys Grammar were used as an annexe.

- Notable people educated at Woking County Grammar School

== Notable alumni ==
- Sarah Mullally, former Chief Nursing Officer for England and Archbishop of Canterbury designate
- Shoaib Bashir, England and Somerset cricketer
- Carlton Cole, West Ham United striker
- Will Forster, MP for Woking, 2024-
- Lizzi Jordan, gold medal-winning Paralympic cyclist
