= Horsell =

Village in Surrey, England

Coordinates: 51.3286°N 0.5617°W

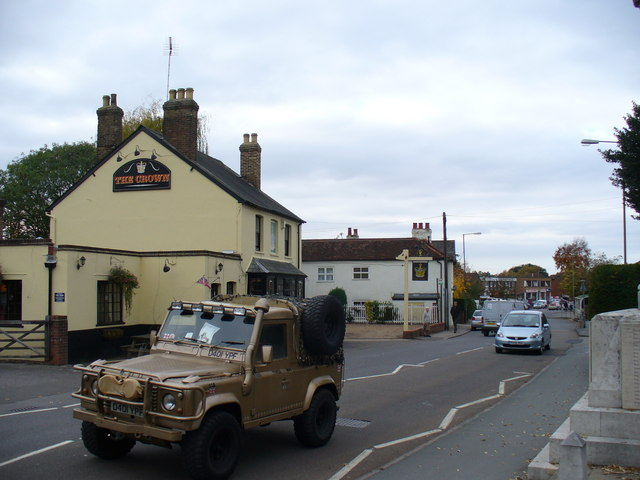
- Horsell High Street

- Location within Surrey
- Population: 9,384
- District: Woking
- Shire county: Surrey
- Region: South East
- Country: England
- Sovereign state: United Kingdom
- Post town: WOKING
- Postcode district: GU21
- Dialling code: 01483
- Police: Surrey
- Fire: Surrey
- Ambulance: South East Coast
- UK Parliament: Woking

Horsell is a village in the borough of Woking in Surrey, England, less than a mile north-west of Woking town centre. In November 2012, its population was 9,384. Horsell is integral to H. G. Wells' classic science fiction novel The War of the Worlds, the sand pits of Horsell Common being the site of the first Martian landing. Horsell Common has since been designated a Site of Special Scientific Interest. Another landmark is the McLaren Technology Centre, built on the northern edge of the common in the early 2000s for the McLaren Group.

== History ==
Horsell was first documented in the 13th century, although the parish church of St Mary the Virgin is believed to date from the middle of the 12th century. The name probably comes from the Anglo-Saxon horig scylf, meaning "muddy slope". This may refer to the hill known as Horsell Rise now carrying the metalled track.

Until the late 19th century, the village consisted of scattered cottages and farms, surrounded by fields, heathlands and nurseries. Suburban development began in the 1880s, but the village remains largely rural in character.

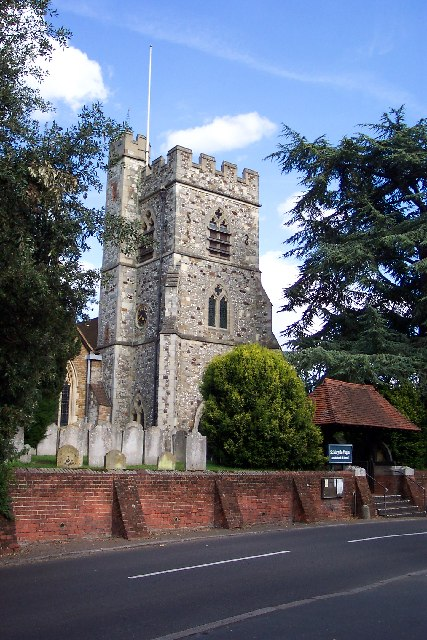
St Mary's Church

In 1951 the civil parish had a population of 6858. On 1 April 1974 the parish was abolished.

== Terrain ==
Horsell is located in northern Surrey and is surrounded by deciduous woodland.

Some geographic locations in Horsell are;

- Church Hill
- Horsell Rise
- Horsell Common
- The sandpit
- ex-Norman Lake

== Horsell Common ==
One of Horsell's significant locations is Horsell Common, where H. G. Wells set the landing of the Martians in his novel War of the Worlds. The common is the site of a bronze-age barrow cemetery as well as a World War I era Muslim burial ground, a bomb crater from World War II, a large seasonal pond with a sandpit, and an open field extending to the grounds of the McLaren headquarters. It hosts a wide variety of plant and wildlife species and has the status of a Site of Special Scientific Interest. The World War II Home Guard base on the common has disappeared. Several smaller institutions were evacuated here during the war.

== Schools and facilities ==
The Anglican parish church of St Mary the Virgin dates back to the middle of the 12th century, and still retains the original doors. The church has strong links with one of the village's junior schools, Horsell C of E Junior School. The village's other schools include the Horsell Village School, built 1851, and independent school St. Andrew's School along with Woking High School, formerly Horsell High School.

It is also the home of Woking and Horsell Cricket Club, whose members have included Alec and Eric Bedser. The famous twins played cricket for Surrey; Alec also played with great success for England.

== Notable people ==
In birth order:

- Norman Pares (1857–1936), Vicar of Horsell from 1897 to 1936, had been a member of the Old Etonians team that won the 1879 FA Cup Final.
- Ursula Bethell (1874–1945), a New Zealand poet, was born in Horsell.
- Lewis Leigh Fermor (1880–1954), chemist/biologist father of travel writer Patrick Leigh Fermor, died in Horsell.
- Alec (1918–2010) and Eric Bedser (1918–2006), first-class cricketers, spent some of their childhood in Horsell.
- Jilly Johnson (born 1953), model, actor, musical artist, writer, attended Horsell Primary School.

== Gallery ==
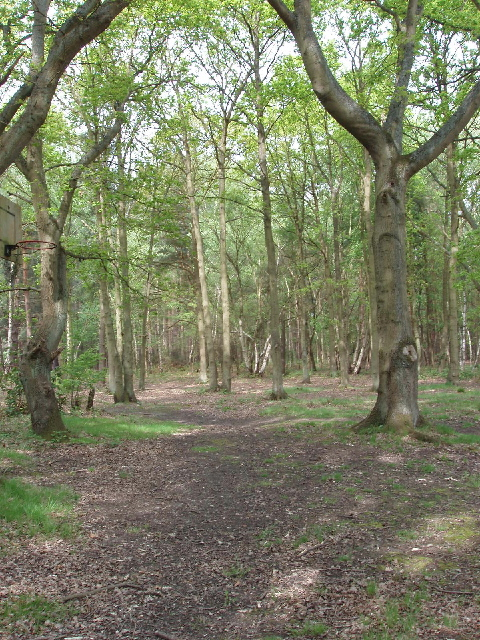
Horsell Common

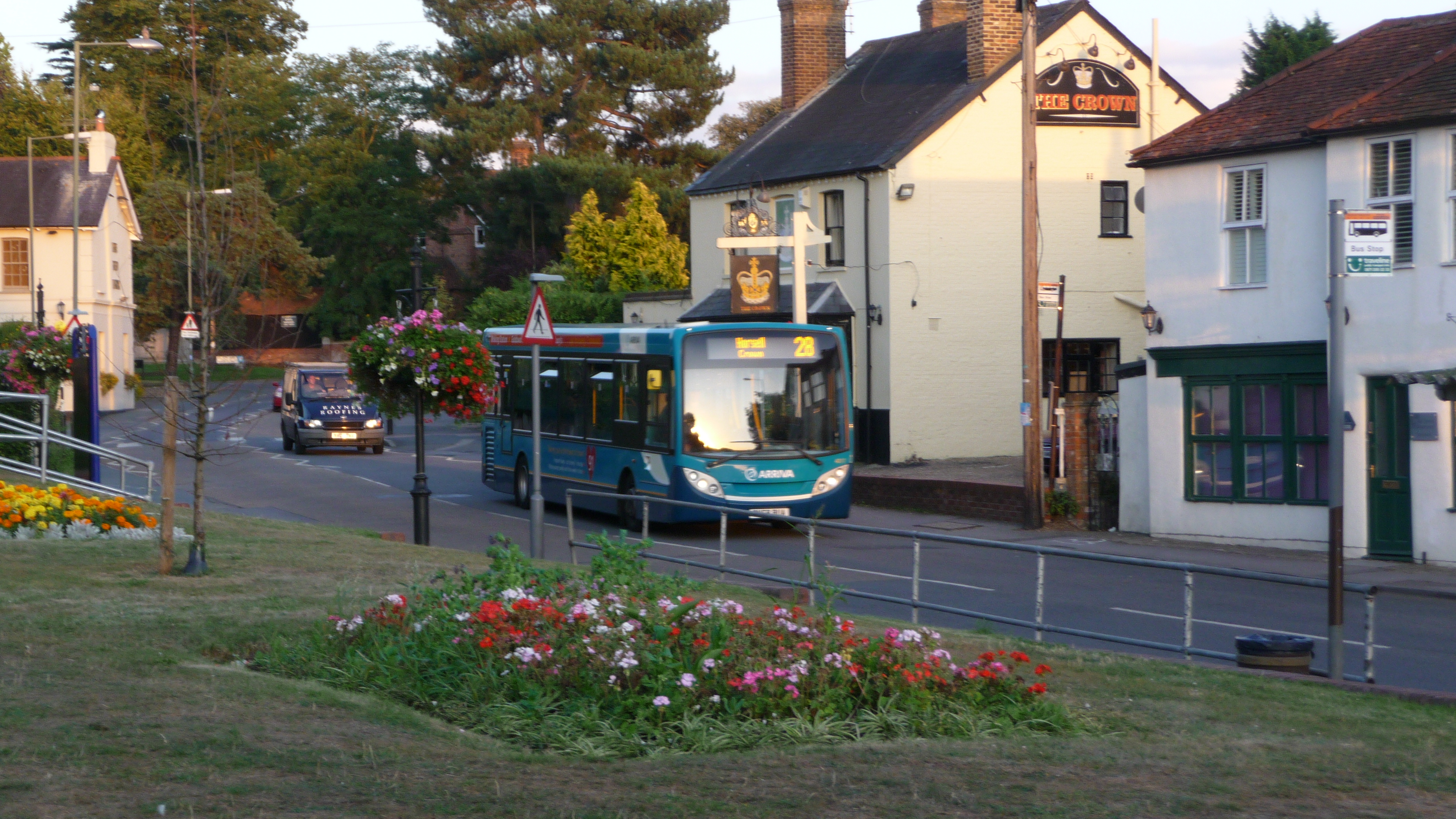
Part of Horsell High Street

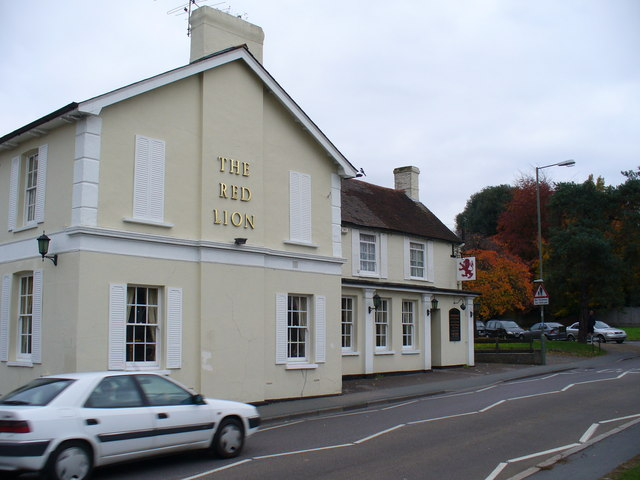
The Red Lion Pub

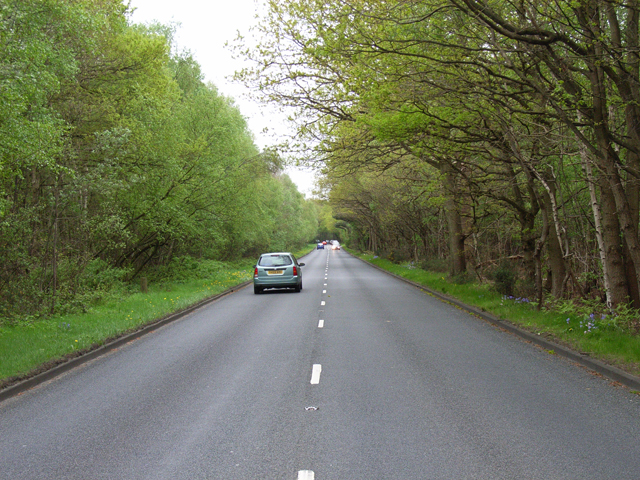
Littlewick Road

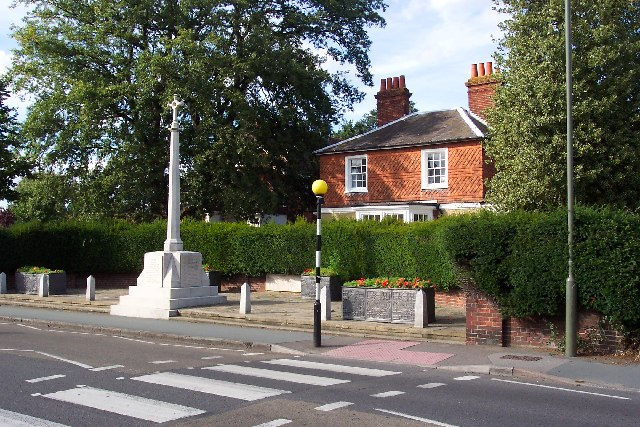
The war memorial

== See also ==
- History of Woking
- List of places of worship in Woking (borough)
