= Muslim Burial Ground, Horsell Common =

Peace garden in Woking, United Kingdom

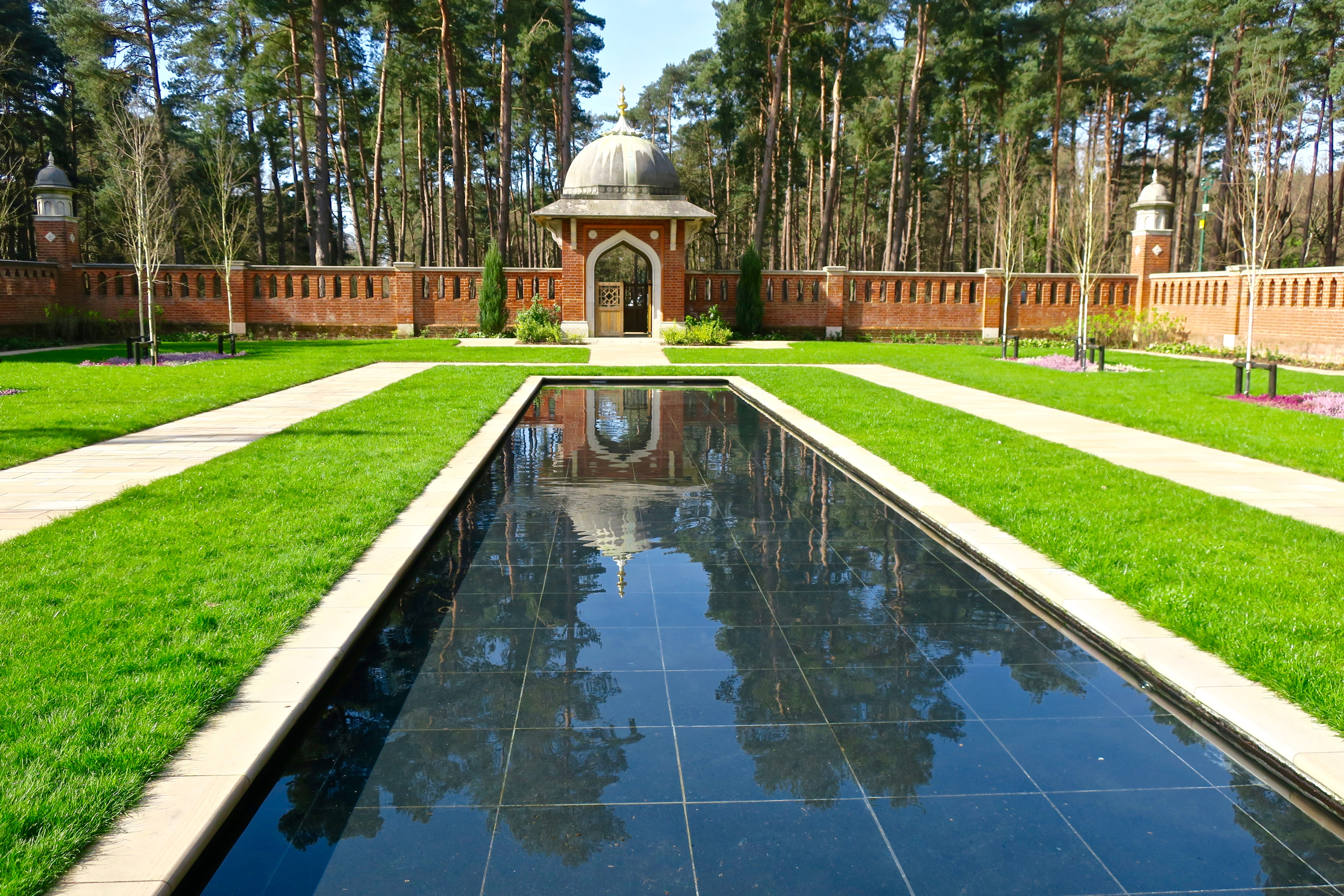
- The reflecting pool looking towards the cchatri, with walls and birch trees visible
- Interactive map of Muslim Burial Ground, Horsell Common

Details
- Established: 1917
- Location: Woking, Surrey
- Country: United Kingdom
- Coordinates: 51°19′45″N 0°32′35″W
- No. of graves: 27

The Muslim Burial Ground, in the town of Woking in the English county of Surrey, was the original resting place of two dozen Muslim soldiers who died during World War I and World War II. It is now a peace garden dedicated to all the Muslim soldiers of the British Indian Army who died during both wars. The site measures about 120 feet (37 m) by 100 feet (30 m) and is located in the southeast corner of Horsell Common about 100 metres (330 ft) off Monument Road. It is a Grade II listed building.

== History ==
=== Cemetery ===
Large numbers of men from the Indian subcontinent fought on the Western Front during World War I. Some of those who were injured were moved to hospitals on the English south coast including one at Brighton Pavilion. Of those, nineteen Muslims died and were buried here. The burial ground was created, at least in part, to counteract German propaganda that Muslim Indian soldiers were not being buried according to their religious rites. The site was on land compulsorily purchased from the Earl of Onslow and chosen for its proximity to the Shah Jahan Mosque, the first purpose-built mosque in the United Kingdom. A further five men who died during World War II were also buried here.

=== Neglect and deterioration ===
In the 1960s the site was becoming subject to vandalism so, in 1968, the bodies were transferred to the Military Cemetery at Brookwood. However, this also meant that the Commonwealth War Graves Commission ceased further maintenance of the site, which became overgrown and further vandalised. Ownership reverted to the Horsell Common Preservation Society, the owners of the surrounding common in succession to the Earl of Onslow.

=== Restoration ===
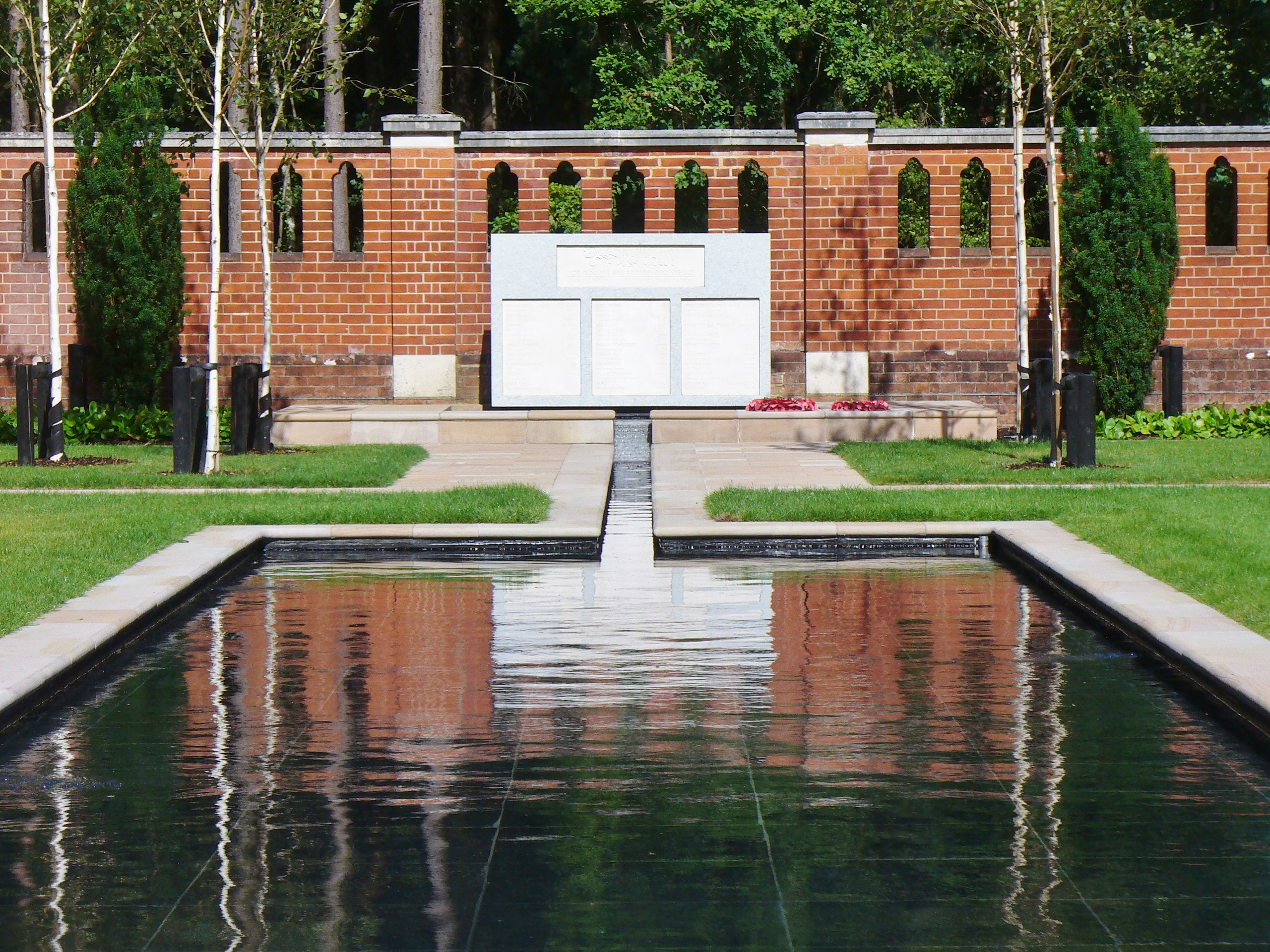
The reflecting pool and memorial stone

In the 1990s, work was undertaken to clear the vegetation and stabilised the walls, as a result of financial support from a local resident of Woking, the musician Paul Weller. In 2011, Woking Borough Council, working in conjunction with the Horsell Common Preservation Society, received a grant from English Heritage, which enabled the restoration of the walls and chatri. In November 2015, the empty interior of the burial ground was landscaped to create a Peace Memorial Garden, dedicated to all the Muslim soldiers of the British Indian Army who died in World War I and II.

The garden brings together the cultural expression of the traditional Islamic Garden with the natural elements of the Common. The original walls and chhatri of the burial ground were retained and now surround a reflecting pond fed by a rill and small waterfall from an upper pool. By this is a memorial stone engraved with the names of the original burials, which acts as the garden’s focus. Himalayan Birch trees planted around the pool also symbolise the servicemen who died.

The architect Jeremy Poll, of the Radley House Partnership, was responsible for the restoration of the walls and chatri, whilst Terra Firma Landscape Architects Ltd, were responsible for the design and implementation of the garden.

== Gallery ==
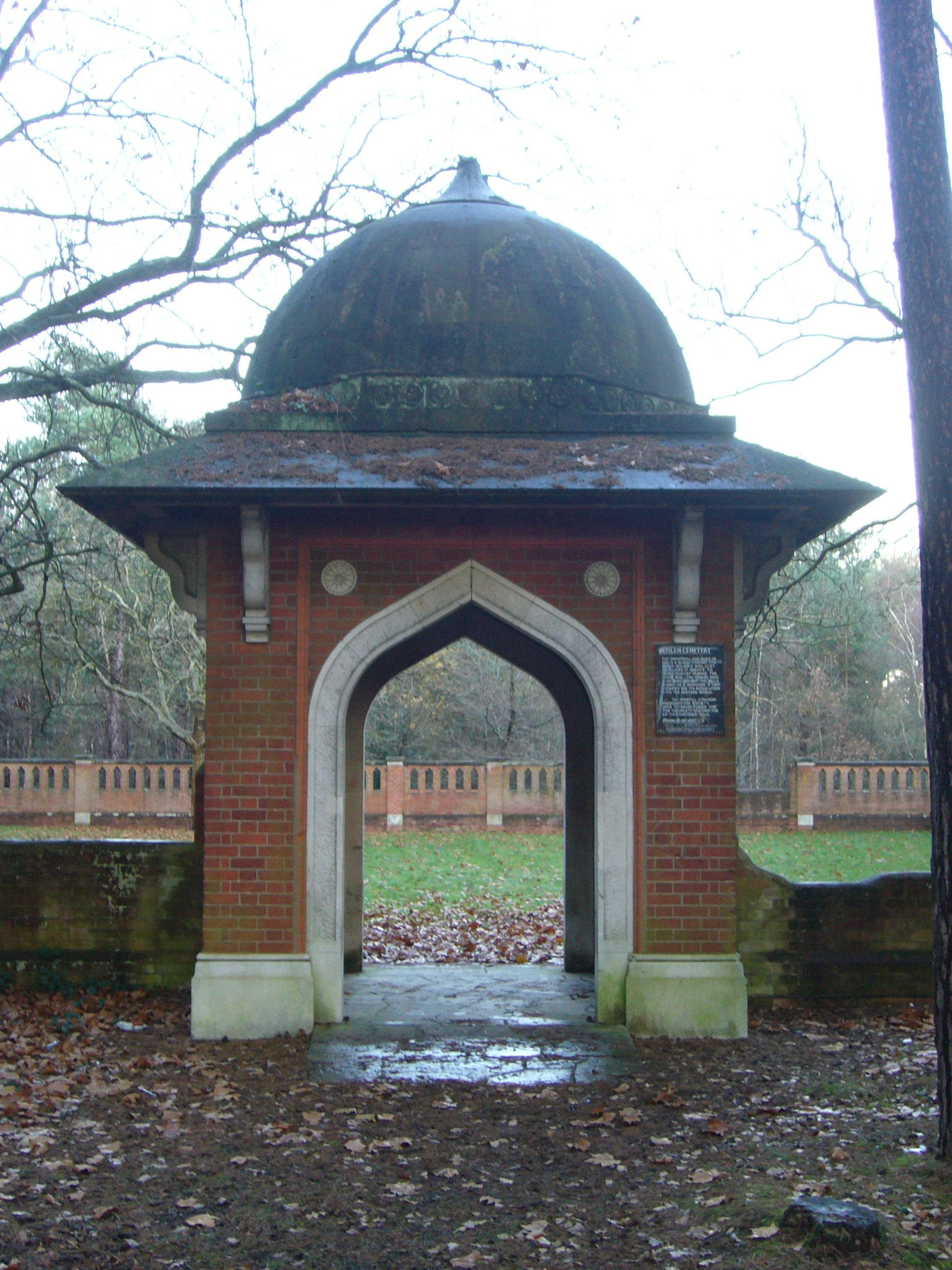

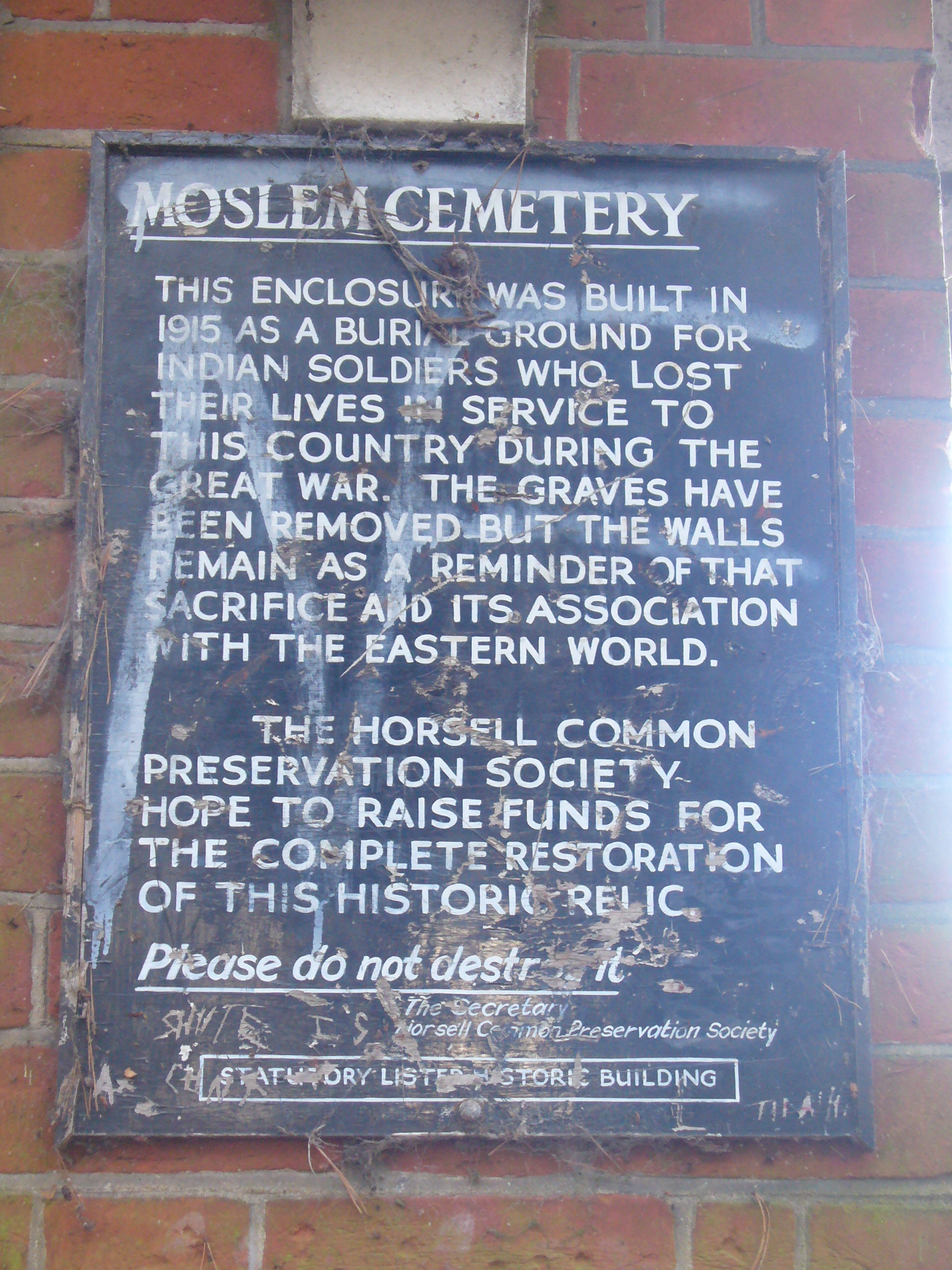

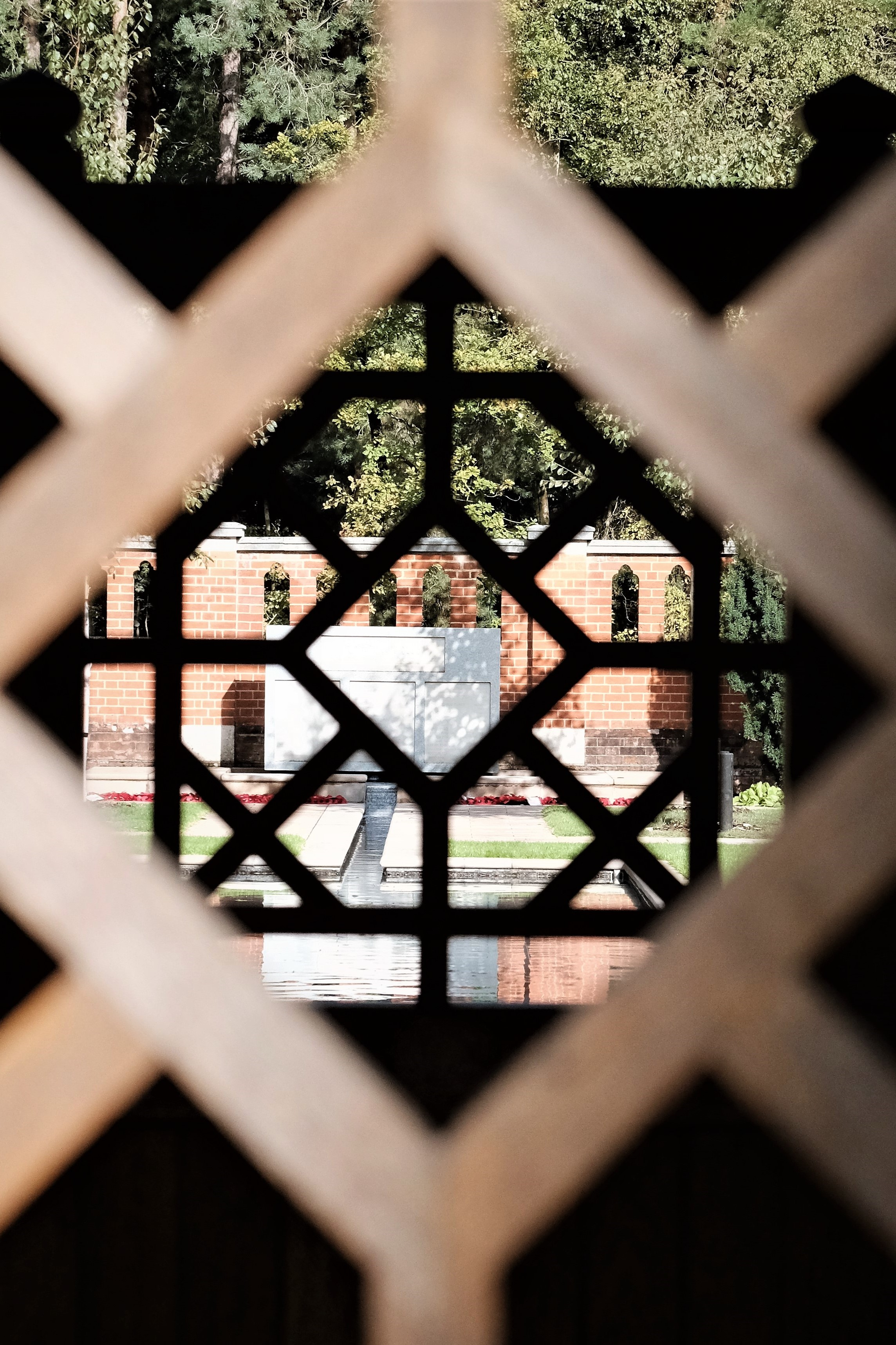
