= Horsell Common =

Park near Woking in Surrey, England

- Site of Special Scientific Interest
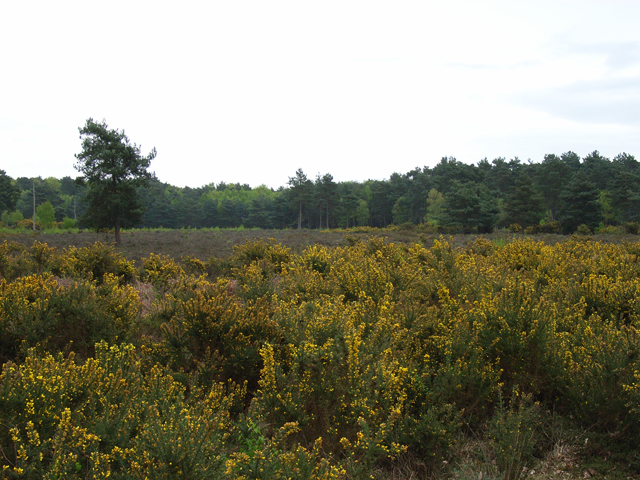
- Location of Horsell Common.
- Area of search: Surrey
- Grid reference: TQ 002 606
- Interest: Biological
- Area: 152.0 hectares (376 acres)
- Notification date: 1986
- Location map: Magic Map

Horsell Common is a 355-hectare (880-acre) open space in Horsell, near Woking in Surrey. It is owned and managed by the Horsell Common Preservation Society. An area of 152 hectares (380 acres) is a biological Site of Special Scientific Interest and part of the Thames Basin Heaths Special Protection Area.

In the south-east corner of the common is the former Muslim Burial Ground, now an Islamic Peace Garden. There are Bronze Age barrows, protected heathland and thousands of trees. There are parts of the common all over Horsell, isolated from the rest of the common by roads. There is a large amount of wildlife on the common.

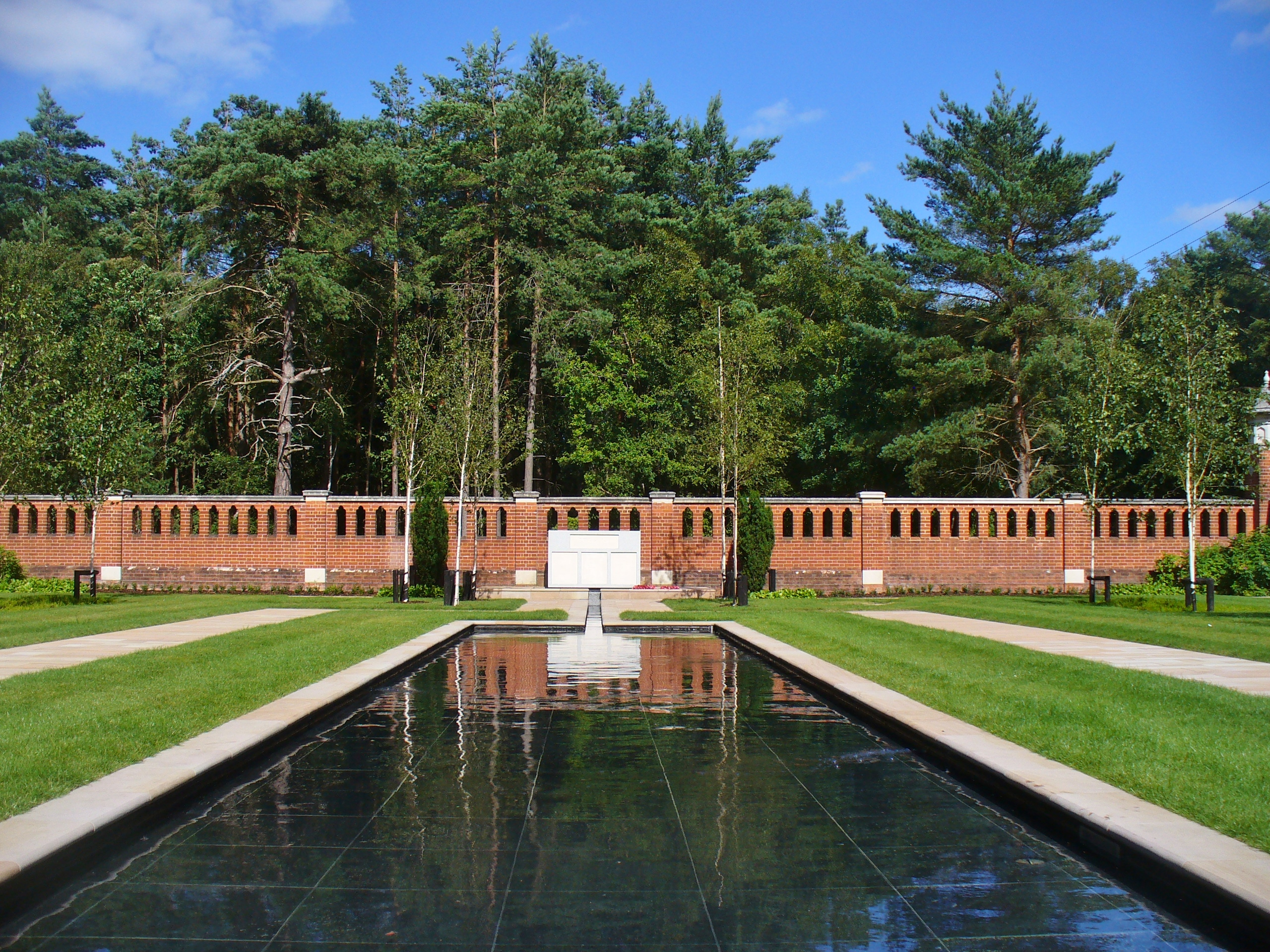
The Muslim Burial Ground

The Sandpit (51.3366°N 0.5512°W) was the location of the first Martian landing in the H. G. Wells novel The War of the Worlds (1897).
