= Woking High School =

Secondary school in Surrey, England

Coordinates: 51.3284°N 0.5709°W

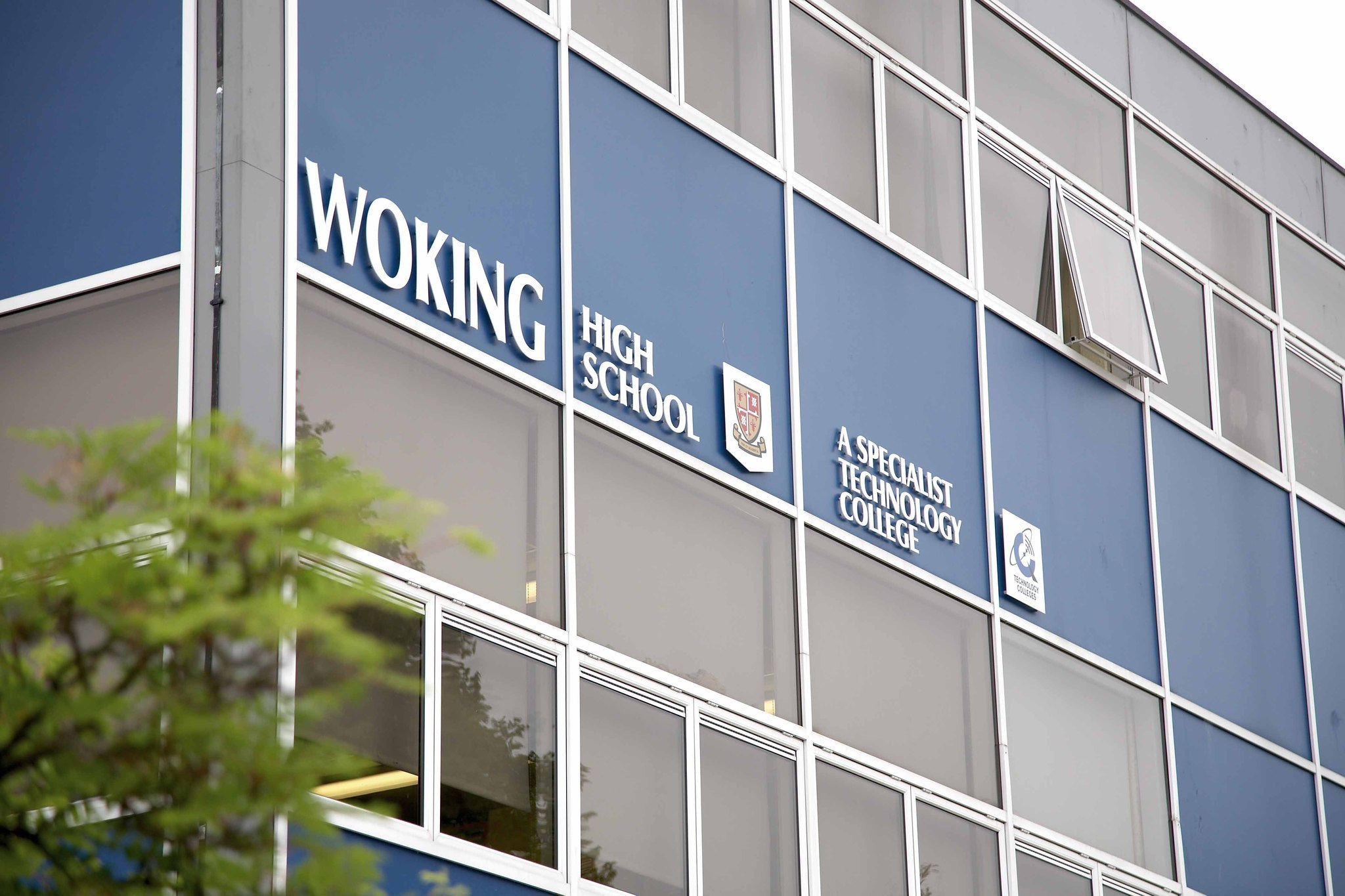

Location
- Morton Road; Woking, Surrey, GU21 4TJ; England

Information
- Type: Academy
- Motto: Inspire, Challenge, Achieve
- Established: 1 August 2013
- Local authority: Surrey
- Specialist: Technology
- Department for Education URN: 139993 Tables
- Headteacher: Maiken Walter
- Gender: Mixed
- Age: 11 to 16
- Enrolment: approx. 1200
- Colours: Red and yellow
- Website: www.wokinghigh.surrey.sch.uk

Woking High School (formerly named Horsell High School) is a coeducational secondary school with academy status, located in the Horsell area of Woking, Surrey, England.

The school has held specialist technology status since 2004, and converted to become an academy in 2013. It has around 1200 pupils on roll.

== Notable alumni ==
- Max Bowden, English actor
- Robert Green, English footballer
- Leadley, English singer-songwriter, YouTuber, and presenter
- Matt Willis, English musician, singer-songwriter, television presenter and actor
