= Church of St Mary the Virgin, Horsell =

Church of St Mary the Virgin
- St Mary's
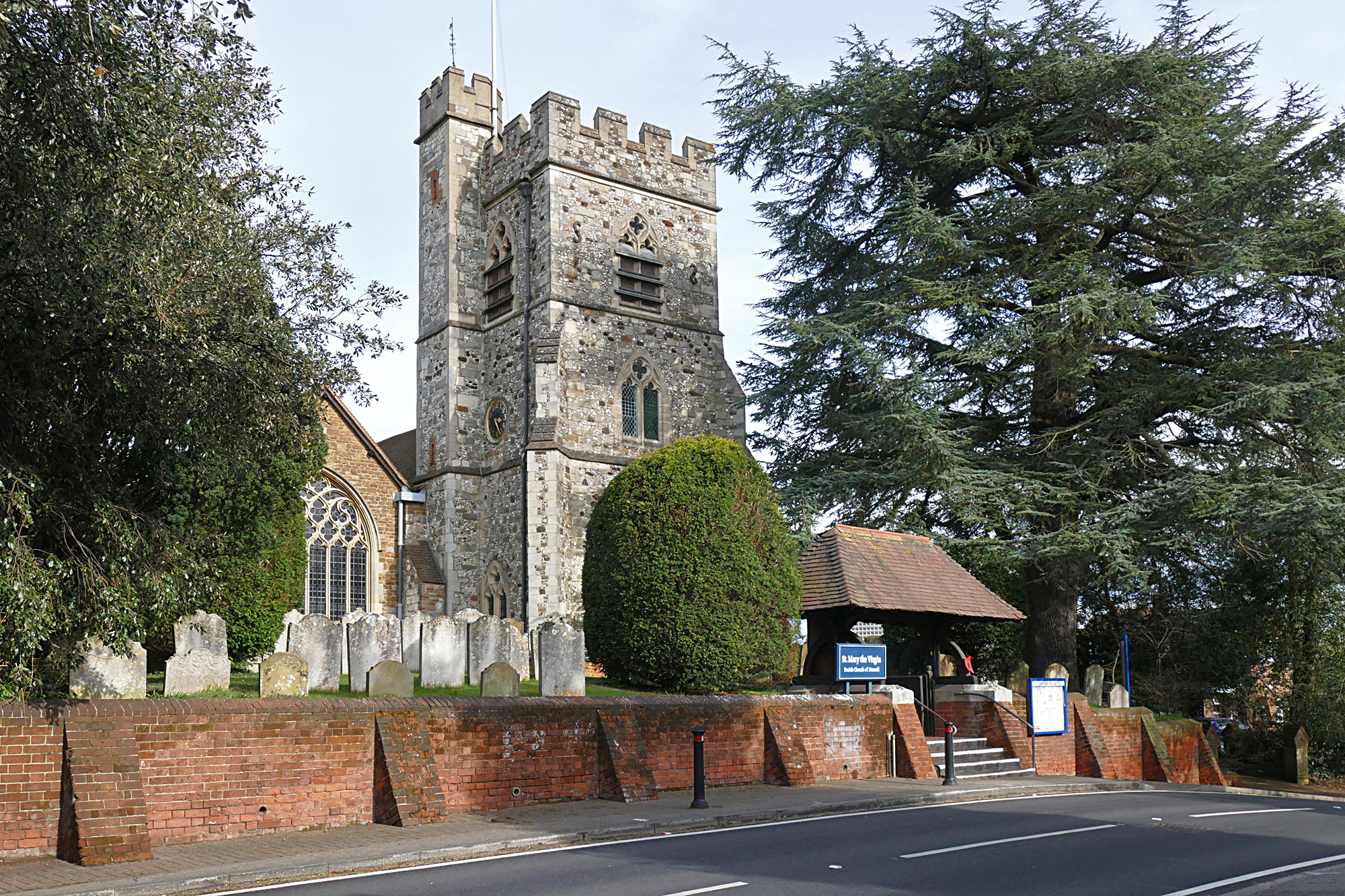
- St Mary the Virgin, Horsell

- Location within Surrey
- 51°19′21″N 0°34′16″W
- OS grid reference: SU 99714 59154
- Location: Woking
- Country: England
- Denomination: Church of England
- Website: St Mary the Virgin's website

History
- Founded: 12th-Century

Architecture
- Functional status: Active
- Architectural type: English Gothic, Gothic Revival

Administration
- Province: Canterbury
- Diocese: Guildford
- Parish: Parish of Horsell

Clergy
- Vicar: Dmitry Lutsenko

The church of St Mary-the-Virgin in Horsell is an Anglican church in the Diocese of Guildford. It is located about one mile away from Woking town centre. The current Vicar is Dmitry Lutsenko. The church is a Grade II* listed building.

== History ==
Parts of the west wall of the nave may date from the middle of the 12th century. 19th century restorations included:

- Removal of the screen in 1840.
- Replacement of the chancel and extension of the nave and south aisle eastwards in 1890.
- The north aisle and vestries were added in 1909.
- The Holy Trinity Chapel was added in 1910.
- The baptistry was added in 1921.

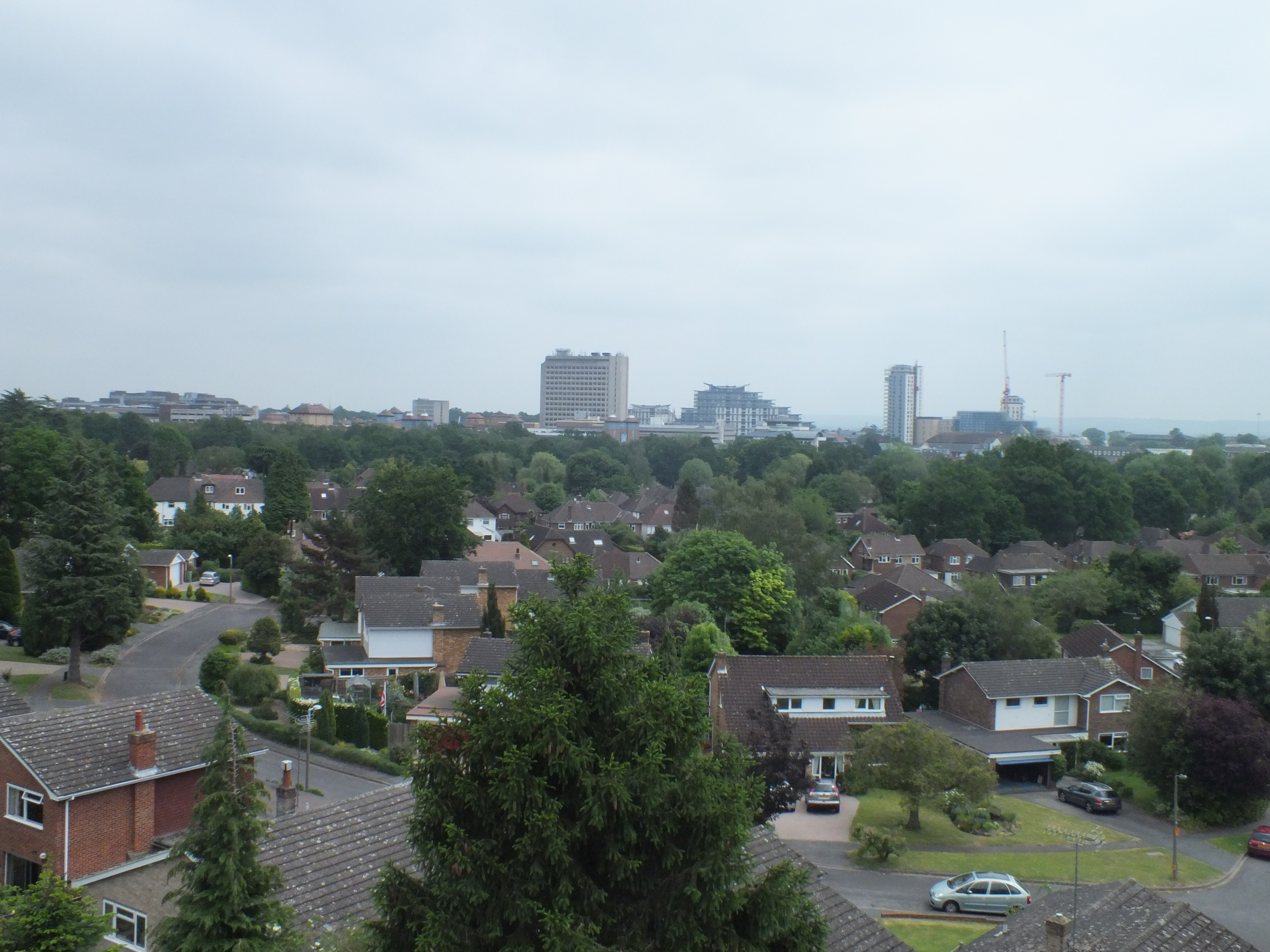
View of Woking from the top of St Mary's church tower
