= Crispin Blunt =

British politician (born 1958)

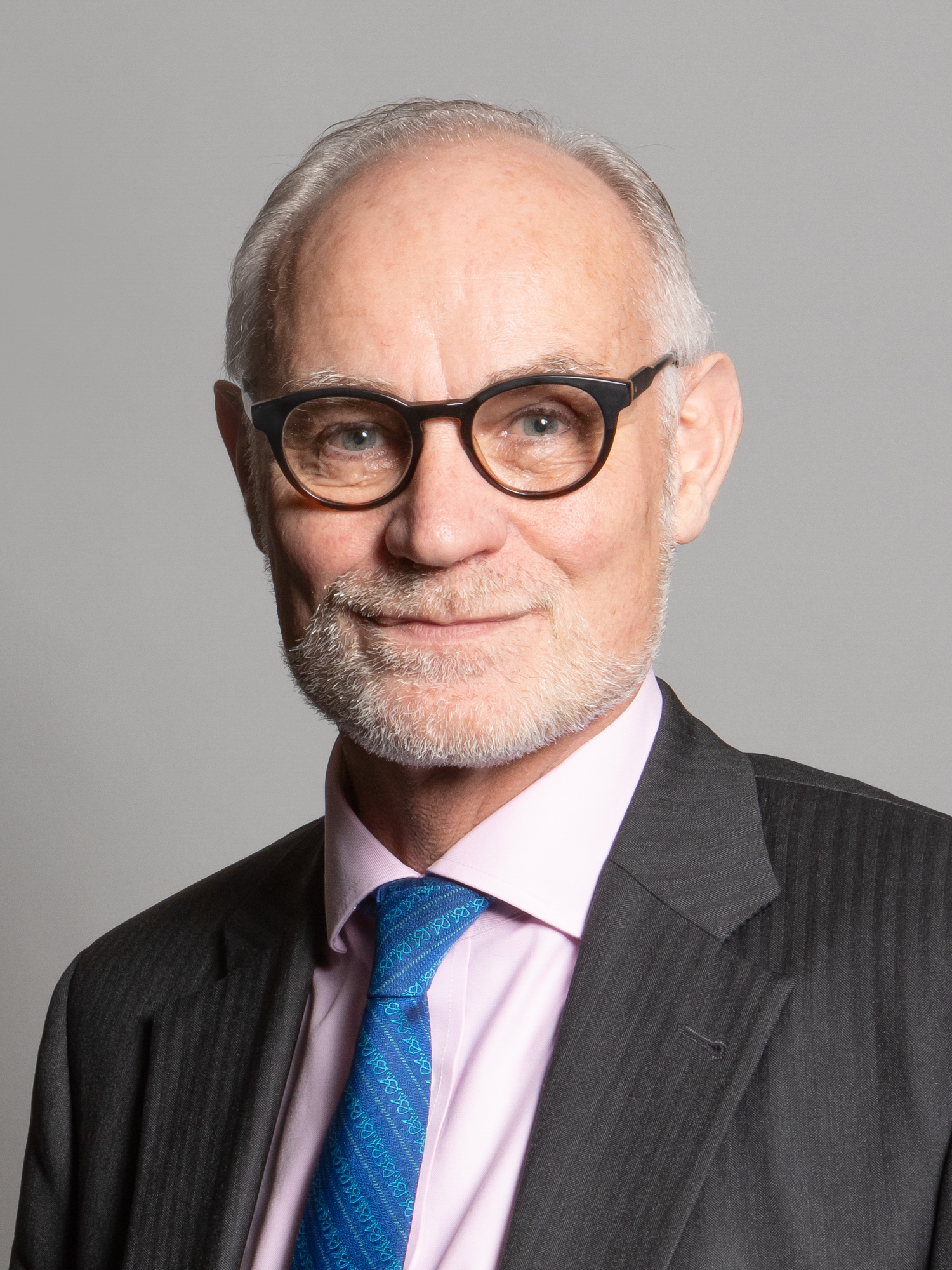
- Official portrait, 2020

Chair of the Foreign Affairs Select Committee
- In office 18 June 2015 – 12 July 2017
- Preceded by: Richard Ottaway
- Succeeded by: Tom Tugendhat

Parliamentary Under-Secretary of State for Prisons and Youth Justice
- In office 6 May 2010 – 4 September 2012
- Prime Minister: David Cameron
- Preceded by: Maria Eagle
- Succeeded by: Jeremy Wright

Member of Parliament for Reigate
- In office 1 May 1997 – 30 May 2024
- Preceded by: Sir George Gardiner
- Succeeded by: Rebecca Paul

Personal details
- Born: Crispin Jeremy Rupert Blunt; 15 July 1960 (age 66) West Germany
- Party: Independent
- Other political affiliations: Conservative (until 2023)
- Spouse: Victoria Jenkins (m. 1990; sep. 2010)
- Children: 2
- Parent: Peter Blunt
- Relatives: Tony Richardson (uncle) Emily Blunt (niece)
- Education: Royal Military Academy Sandhurst; University College, Durham; Cranfield School of Management
- Occupation: Politician
- Awards: Queen's Medal

Military service
- Allegiance: United Kingdom
- Branch/service: British Army
- Years of service: 1979–1990
- Rank: Captain
- Unit: 13th/18th Royal Hussars (Queen Mary's Own)

Crispin Jeremy Rupert Blunt (born 15 July 1960) is a British politician who served as the Member of Parliament (MP) for Reigate from 1997 to 2024. Formerly a member of the Conservative Party, he was the Parliamentary Under-Secretary of State for Prisons and Youth Justice within the Ministry of Justice from 2010 to 2012 and chair of the Foreign Affairs Select Committee from 2015 until 2017.

Blunt first entered the House of Commons at the 1997 general election, when he replaced the then MP Sir George Gardiner, who had been deselected by the Constituency Conservative Association Executive Council and joined the Referendum Party. In 2013, Blunt was deselected by the Constituency Executive Council, with speculation that this was due to his public announcement that he was gay. However, after a ballot of party members in Reigate, the decision was overturned by a margin of 5–1 and Blunt was reselected as the Conservative candidate for the 2015 general election.

In October 2023, Blunt was arrested on suspicion of rape and possession of controlled substances, and released on conditional bail. He subsequently had the Conservative Party whip removed, continuing to sit as an independent MP until the dissolution of Parliament in May 2024. Blunt did not stand for re-election at the subsequent general election. In May 2025, the investigation into alleged rape was dropped by the police due to lack of evidence.

In March 2026 at Westminster Magistrates' Court, Blunt admitted four drugs charges, including possession of crystal meth, GBL, amphetamine, and cannabis, that were found at his home following a chemsex party. He was convicted on all four counts and fined £1200. Crispin stated that it was the person who sold him the drugs that subsequently falsely accused him of rape as part of a blackmail and extortion attempt, and that he did go to the police at the time but that the police was unable to help him.

== Early life and military service ==
Blunt was born on 15 July 1960 in West Germany, one of three sons of English parents Adrienne (née Richardson) and Major-General Peter Blunt (1923–2003). His niece is the actress Emily Blunt.

He was educated at Wellington College, an independent school in Berkshire in the United Kingdom. He then attended the Royal Military Academy Sandhurst, where he won the Queen's Medal, following which he gained a regular commission in the British Army. As an in-service degree, he studied politics at University College, Durham between 1981 and 1984, where he was elected president of the Durham Union Society in 1983. He graduated with an upper second-class honours degree. In 1991, he gained a Master of Business Administration (MBA) degree at the Cranfield School of Management.

Blunt was commissioned as an officer in the British Army on 4 August 1979 as a second lieutenant. Having been commissioned into the General List, he transferred to the 13th/18th Royal Hussars (Queen Mary's Own) on 8 March 1980, and his regular commission was confirmed. He was promoted to lieutenant on 4 August 1981, and to captain on 4 February 1986. During the 1980s, he was stationed in Cyprus, Germany, and Britain, serving as a troop leader, regimental operations officer and armoured reconnaissance squadron commander. He resigned his commission on 24 September 1990, and was appointed to the Reserve of Officers.

== Political career ==
Blunt contested his first Parliamentary seat at the 1992 general election, as the Conservative candidate in West Bromwich East, but was not successful. From 1991 to 1992, Blunt was a representative of the Forum of Private Business. In 1993, he was appointed a special adviser to Malcolm Rifkind, the Secretary of State for Defence, and worked in the same capacity when Rifkind became Foreign Secretary from 1995 to 1997.

=== Member of Parliament ===
At the 1997 general election, Blunt was elected to Parliament as Member for Reigate in Surrey, succeeding the long-serving strongly Eurosceptic MP Sir George Gardiner, who had been deselected by the local Conservative Party. Blunt was subsequently appointed to the House of Commons Defence Select Committee.

In July 1997, he was elected as Secretary of the Conservative Foreign and Commonwealth Affairs Committee and the Conservative Middle East Council. In May 2000, he joined the House of Commons Environment, Transport and Regional Affairs Select Committee and in July 2003 he was elected Chairman of the Conservative Middle East Council.

The new Conservative Party leader Iain Duncan Smith appointed Blunt to the Opposition front bench as Shadow Minister for Northern Ireland in September 2001. In July 2002, he was appointed as deputy to Tim Yeo, Shadow Secretary of State for Trade and Industry. On 1 May 2003 he resigned his position on the front bench, saying that Duncan Smith was a "handicap" to the Conservatives. He decided to resign at that time in the expectation that the Conservative Party would make over 500 gains in the 2003 local government elections, but in the belief that these would be achieved in spite of, rather than because of, Duncan Smith's leadership. Blunt timed his resignation so that it became public after the polls closed but before the results were declared.

The following day he was unanimously reselected by his local party as their prospective parliamentary candidate, but in May 2003, he failed to persuade 25 of his fellow Conservative MPs to call for a vote of confidence. He accepted that no challenge for the party leadership would be immediately forthcoming and returned to the back benches. In November 2003, Michael Howard replaced Duncan Smith after a vote of no confidence.

Blunt became a party whip under Howard, but on 9 June 2005, he took a leave of absence from that role to support the expected leadership bid of Malcolm Rifkind. However, when Rifkind was knocked out of the party leadership contest, Blunt returned to the Whips' office and wrote to all party members in his constituency asking them to rank the remaining contenders in order of preference so he could best represent his constituents.

Blunt is a former joint chair of the Council for the Advancement of Arab-British Understanding. When the Conservative and Liberal Democrat Coalition formed a government in 2010, Blunt was appointed as the first Minister of State for Prisons at the Ministry of Justice. His responsibilities included prisons and probation, youth justice, criminal law and sentencing policy, and criminal justice. He was also a member of the All-Party Parliamentary Humanist Group.

In November 2013, Blunt was re-selected to stand in the 2015 general election for the Conservative Party, having undergone a postal ballot of constituency members. The postal ballot was triggered when the executive council came to a vote with a majority decision not to endorse his candidacy. Having won the postal ballot Blunt called for the executive council to consider their position. The lack of support from a majority of the executive council was partly attributed to the allegedly homophobic views of some older Conservative voters in the area. Roger Newstead, the chairman of the Reigate South and Earlswood Branch, wrote a private letter to Ben Mearns, who had resigned from the branch committee after protesting the decision to force a postal ballot. In the letter, Newstead said: "I do not know what motivated my executive colleagues but I suspect that Crispin has been the author of his own misfortune. There is no doubt in my mind that his very public and totally unnecessary announcement that he was 'gay' was the final straw for some members, particularly those in the north of the borough, with whom there had been a number of previous disagreements on policy matters. A number of lady members were very offended by the manner in which his marriage broke down. Apparently Victoria's version was very different from Crispin's".

Later clarifying his views to The Guardian, Newstead said: "I still say it was unnecessary [for Crispin Blunt to come out]. To me it was an error of judgment. I wouldn't have done anything like that. I would have just said if anyone had asked me: politicians have a unique lifestyle, it doesn't suit everybody and there is a long history of parliamentary marriages breaking down. You don't have to go out and tell people you have got homosexual tendencies. It is a private matter and it shouldn't have been put in the public domain. He put it in the public domain".

In May 2014, Blunt was one of seven unsuccessful candidates for the chairmanship of the House of Commons Defence Select Committee. On 19 June 2015, it was announced that Blunt had been elected to the chairmanship of the Foreign Affairs Select Committee, a post he held until 12 July 2017 when he was defeated by Conservative candidate Tom Tugendhat.

Prior to the 2016 EU Referendum, Blunt supported Brexit.

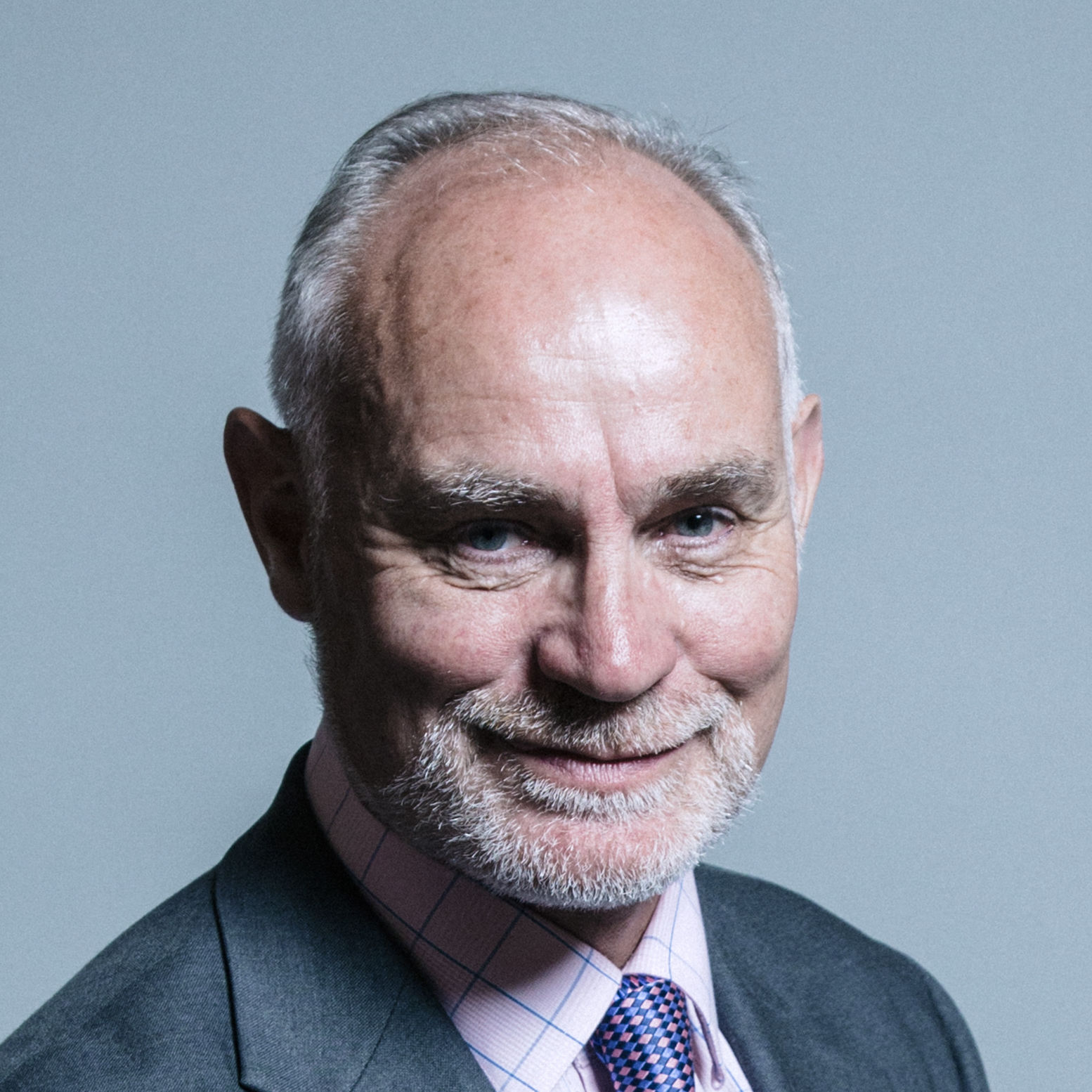
Blunt in 2017.

In September 2017, Blunt was elected chair of the All Party Parliamentary Humanist Group, the cross-party group which represents humanists in Parliament. In 2018, he became an honorary associate of the National Secular Society.

On 11 April 2022, after fellow MP Imran Ahmad Khan was found guilty of a child sex offence, The next day Blunt issued a statement in defence of Ahmad Khan which criticised the verdict, describing it as an "international scandal, with dreadful wider implications for millions of LGBT+ Muslims around the world" and said that it "relied on lazy tropes about LGBT+ people". He also said that he hoped for Ahmad Khan to return to public service. Blunt's intervention was strongly condemned and members of the all-party parliamentary group (APPG) on global LGBT+ affairs, which was chaired by Blunt, resigned in protest. The following day Blunt apologised for his comments, and resigned as chair of the APPG. In May 2022, Blunt backtracked on this apology and described Ahmad Khan's conviction as a "serious miscarriage of justice".

On 1 May 2022, he announced he would not seek re-election at the 2024 general election.

On 16 October 2022, he became the first Conservative MP to publicly call for Liz Truss to resign, calling it "blindingly obvious" that she must go.

=== Political views ===
==== Age of consent, gay rights, transgender rights ====
In 1998, Blunt argued against the equal age of consent for homosexuals and heterosexuals, stating that "It is also clear that there is a much greater strand of homosexuality than of heterosexuality which depends for its gratification on the exploitation of youth". In 2004, he was also absent for votes on legalising (same-sex) civil partnerships and allowing marriages to remain valid if they became a same-sex marriage after the granting of a Gender Recognition Certificate. In June 2016, Blunt championed LGBT rights, during the campaigning of the EU referendum, stating that the UK would be the "world's leading proponents of LGBTI rights, in or out of the EU".

Blunt's voting record in Parliament had previously been broadly unsympathetic towards gay rights. He later stated regret for that part of his voting record. He became Chair of the All Party Parliamentary Group on Global Lesbian, Gay, Bisexual and Transgender Rights.

Blunt was one of the most prominent Conservative advocates of transgender rights. He argued that supporting transgender individuals was an extension of the party's tradition of supporting individual liberty.

==== Defense ====
Crisp repeatedly opposed the renewal of the UK Trident nuclear weapons programme.

==== Drugs ====
In January 2016, he stated that he uses poppers, during a parliamentary debate that discussed banning them along with other legal highs. He became chair of both the Conservative Drug Policy Reform Group and the All Party Parliamentary Group for Drug Policy Reform. During his 2026 trial for drug possession, at which he was convicted, he asserted that all drugs ought to be legal.

==== Eurosceptic ====
A long-term Eurosceptic, Blunt issued a pamphlet in 1998 when first elected to parliament which called for an in-out referendum.

==== Foreign policy ====
He voted against the Cameron–Clegg coalition government in 2013 on the issue of British military intervention in the Syrian civil war. He was Vice Chair of the All Party Parliamentary Groups on Miscarriages of Justice; Kurdistan in Turkey and Syria.

In 2015, he met with Iran's Chargé d'affaires to London Mohammad Hassan Habibollah-zadeh. Blunt called for Iran and the UK developing mutual cooperation in different fields, and expressed interest of the British parliament developing relations with the Iranian parliament and exchange parliamentary delegations.

In 2015, as Chair of the Foreign Affairs Select Committee, Blunt argued that Britain should "suck it up" regarding Russian military intervention in Syria, that Russia was within its rights to support Bashar al-Assad's regime with military airstrikes, and advocated for a policy of pragmatic engagement with Moscow.

Blunt has been described as "a long-term critic of Israel". He was a co-director of the International Centre of Justice for Palestinians, and in October 2023 he announced the group's intention to prosecute UK government leaders for "aiding and abetting war crimes in Gaza" amid the Gaza war, warning his colleagues in Westminster of the peril of guilt through complicity. In 2023, Blunt became the first Conservative MP to call for a ceasefire during the Israel-Palestine conflict.

==== Prayer ====
Blunt called attention to the presence of prayers as part of Parliament's formal business. He put forward an Early Day Motion on the issue in 2019, arguing that the practice was discriminatory against non-religious MPs since those MPs who choose to pray are able to reserve a seat for parliamentary business that day and are more likely to ask questions; there are 650 elected MPs in the UK Parliament, but only enough seating for 427 at any one time. In 2020, he again raised the issue in the House, with new speaker Lindsay Hoyle expressing sympathy with the need for reform.

==== UK politics ====
On 16 October 2022, Blunt stated that in his opinion Liz Truss would have to resign as Prime Minister. Blunt said, "I think the game is up and it's now a question as to how the succession is managed. If there is such a weight of opinion in the parliamentary party that we have to have a change, then it will be effected." He was the first Conservative MP to openly call for Truss's resignation.

== Personal life ==
=== Family and interests ===
Blunt married Victoria Jenkins in September 1990 in Kensington, and they have a daughter and son. In August 2010, he announced that he was leaving his wife, in order "to come to terms with his homosexuality". They divorced in 2025.

Blunt is a cricketer, a former member of the Parliamentarians team. He is a member of the Marylebone Cricket Club.

=== Legal issues ===
In October 2023, Blunt was arrested by Surrey Police on suspicion of rape and possession of drugs. He was released on police bail pending further investigation. He had the Conservative Party whip removed, and subsequently sat as an independent MP for the remainder of the parliamentary session. Blunt said that he expected to be cleared, and that he had previously reported an attempt of extortion to the police. In April 2024, it was reported that Blunt had not had his bail extended, and that the police were continuing with their investigation. In May 2025, the police dropped their investigation into allegations of rape, due to lack of evidence, but said that they would continue their investigation into the suspicion of possession of controlled substances.

In March 2026 the Crown Prosecution Service announced that Blunt had been charged with one count of possessing a class A drug (methamphetamine) and three counts of possessing class B drugs (GBL, cannabis, and amphetamine), found at his home following a chemsex party. He pleaded guilty to the charges at Westminster Magistrates' Court on 25 March 2026, and was convicted on all four counts and fined £1200. Crispin said that it was the dealer who sold him the drugs that subsequently falsely accused him of rape as part of a blackmail and extortion attempt, and that he did go to the police at the time but that they were unable to help him.

Parliament of the United Kingdom
Preceded by George Gardiner	Member of Parliament for Reigate; 1997–2024	Succeeded by Rebecca Paul
