= Peter Simon =

Peter Simon may refer to:

- Peter Simon the Younger (1750–c. 1810), English engraver, one of the engravers who worked on The Seven Ages of Man
- Peter Simon (actor) (born 1943), American actor
- Peter Simon (presenter), UK television presenter
- Peter Simon (businessman), founder of London-based Monsoon Stores Ltd (1973)
- Peter June Simon (born 1980), Filipino basketball player
- Peter Simon (politician) (born 1967), German politician

== See also ==
- Simon Peter, apostle
- Peter Simons (disambiguation)
