= General Blunt =

General Blunt may refer to:

- Asa P. Blunt (1826–1889), Union Army brevet brigadier general
- James G. Blunt (1826–1881), Union Army major general
- Peter Blunt (1923–2003), British Army major general
