= Loaf (company) =

British retail company

Really Comfy Beds Ltd
- Trade name: Loaf
- Formerly: The Sleep Room
- Company type: Private
- Founded: 2008
- Headquarters: London, United Kingdom
- Products: Homewares
- Owner: Charlie Marshall
- Number of employees: 120
- Website: loaf.com

Loaf is a British company, which operates as a high street retailer. Charlie Marshall founded the retail brand, which was formerly known as The Sleep Room. Their showrooms are mainly focused around the London area.

It is currently one of the fastest growing retail companies in the United Kingdom. In 2013, it listed on the Sunday Times Fast Track 100, and has also received investment from the Monsoon & Accessorize founder, Peter Simon.

In May 2017 the company opened its third showroom in Spitalfields, London.

== History ==
Charlie Marshall founded The Sleep Room in 2008, after previously owning and selling another business. Marshall generated the startup capital for The Sleep Room from the sale of his previous company, Primal Soup and personal finance he had accrued from real estate development. The amount invested initially was £350,000. During the early days, Marshall focused on bed sales, providing 12 different styles of bed, with a single mattress type. It was stated that Marshall visited over 187 mattress and bed factories before deciding on the mattress he would sell through The Sleep Room.

In 2012, it was announced that the company would be rebranded, and would now operate under the name Loaf. The rebrand followed the expansion of the company's product range away from beds and sleep related products. The Telegraph covered the launch of their sofas and armchairs, while also announcing the company would be selling lighting, rugs and textiles. During the next year, it was announced that the company would expand to selling kitchen furniture.

Loaf was listed on the Sunday Times Fast Track 100 in 2013. They were in 40th position overall, and the 3rd fastest growing retailer in the United Kingdom. The company's growth continued in 2014 and they again featured in the 2014 Sunday Times list. This time Loaf were in 52nd position, with their turnover rising from £7.8 million to £15.9 million over the 12-month period.

In early 2014, it was announced that the Monsoon & Accessorize founder had acquired a substantial stake in the retail business. By the end of 2014, the company had reached a turnover of £20 million.

In July 2020, Loaf and cosmetics manufacturer Neal's Yard Remedies will have a new home for their internet activities, in the current UK facility of third-party distribution supplier Wincanton.

== Locations ==
In 2014, the founder was quoted in an interview that new showrooms would be referred to as 'Loaf Shacks’.

Following the investment from Monsoon & Accessorize founder, it was stated that the company would be looking to open 10 new stores over a period of 4 years, predominantly in the London area. In October 2014, it was announced that the first of these stores would soon be opening in the area of London. In June 2015, it was announced that a location had been chosen for the 'Loaf Shack’, which would be located in Battersea, London.
