= Peter Simons =

Peter Simons may refer to:

- Peter Simons (academic) (born 1950), British philosopher and academic
- Peter Simons (businessman) (born 1964), Canadian businessman

== See also ==
- Peter Simon (disambiguation)
- Peter Symonds (disambiguation)
