= Peter Symonds (disambiguation) =

Peter Symonds was a merchant.

Peter Symonds may also refer to:

- Peter Symonds College
- Peter Symonds Charity

== See also ==
- Peter Simons (disambiguation)
