= Peter Simon (businessman) =

British businessman

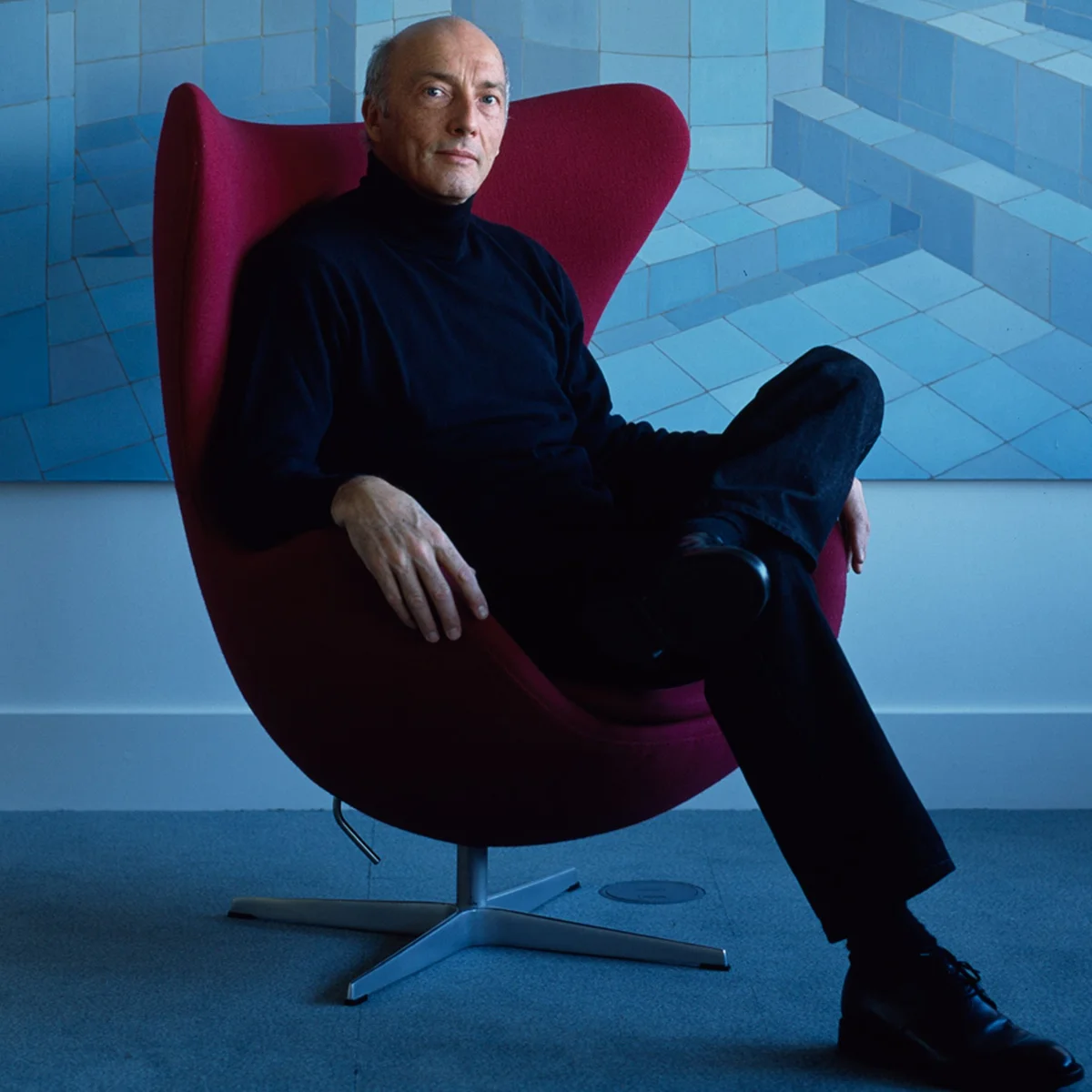
- Born: Peter Simon; August 1949 (age 77); Ceylon (now Sri Lanka)
- Occupation: Businessman
- Known for: Founder of Monsoon Accessorize
- Spouse: Kate Simon (m. 1977; div. 2000)
- Children: 6 (4 with Kate Simon)

Peter Simon (born August 1949) is a British businessman and art collector who is the founder and owner for over 50 years of leading British fashion retailer Monsoon and Accessorize. A pioneer of the women's fashion dating back to the early 1970s, Simon founded one of the UK's most successful fashion brands back in the early 1970s. As of 2019 Simon has reached £1 billion.

== Early life ==
Born in Sri Lanka, he was educated at boarding school before going on to live in Ibiza.

On a road trip from London to Rajasthan, India via Turkey, Iran and Afghanistan, he has said he was inspired by the colour and local fashion.

== Career ==
After failing A-levels, Peter Simon worked as a seller of frozen fish fingers for Bird's Eye to travel the world in the late 60s, inspired by the hippie movement he decided to start selling hippie clothing.

Simon's clothing empire started with a stall in London's Portobello market in the 1970s. In 1973, Simon started out selling woollen coats from Afghanistan that he had bought for £1,000 on Portobello Market, London using the money from the sale of these coats to open his first Monsoon store in Knightsbridge in 1973. The name was chosen because Simon was born in Sri Lanka during the monsoon. . A year later Simon opened Monsoon's first physical outlet in Beauchamp Place, London.

The retail chain was originally known for retailing hippie clothes before Simon re-positioned the company as a mainstream female fashion brand.

In 1984, Simon opened the first branch of accessories retailer Accessorize.

In 1989, Simon floated the combined company.

In 2007, Simon bought back all shares in the company held by external investors to become 100 percent owner. He had previously tried to acquire these shares in 2003 and 2004.

In 2014, Simon invested in homewear brand Loaf.

In 2020, during the COVID-19 Pandemic, Monsoon went into bankruptcy and was then bought out from the Holding company Adena Brands by Simon.

According to The Sunday Times Rich List in 2019, Simon has a net worth of £1 billion.

== Personal life ==
He married Kate Simon in 1977 and was married to her for 23 years. The couple divorced in 2000.

Simon had previously dated actress Jane Seymour in the mid 1970s. They dated following a photo shoot in India shortly after Seymour filmed the 1973 Bond film Live and Let Die, but the relationship did not last. Simon has six children, of whom 4 are with Kate Simon his first wife (George, Jessica, Zara, and Camilla) and 2 children who were born after his first marriage had ended, are with two much younger Russian women.

On 30 September 2017, his son George Simon, a property developer, was killed after his Porsche Turbo 911 left the road and collided into a tree at North Marden, near Chichester. Simon was left devastated by the death of his eldest son. George was just 32 years old at the time.

A contemporary art collector, he is a trustee of the Tate Gallery. He started the Monsoon Art Collection in 2000.

In 2015, it was reported that he was planning to knock five homes into one in Chelsea, London, which was met with local dissent.

In 2023, at the age of 77, Simon celebrated 50 years of fashion with Monsoon, as reported in the Guardian. where in celebration of its 50 years, he created a Monsoon pop-up vintage shop down the road from Monsoon's original Portobello Road market store.
