= Monsoon Accessorize =

British company with two international retail clothing chains

Monsoon Accessorize Ltd.

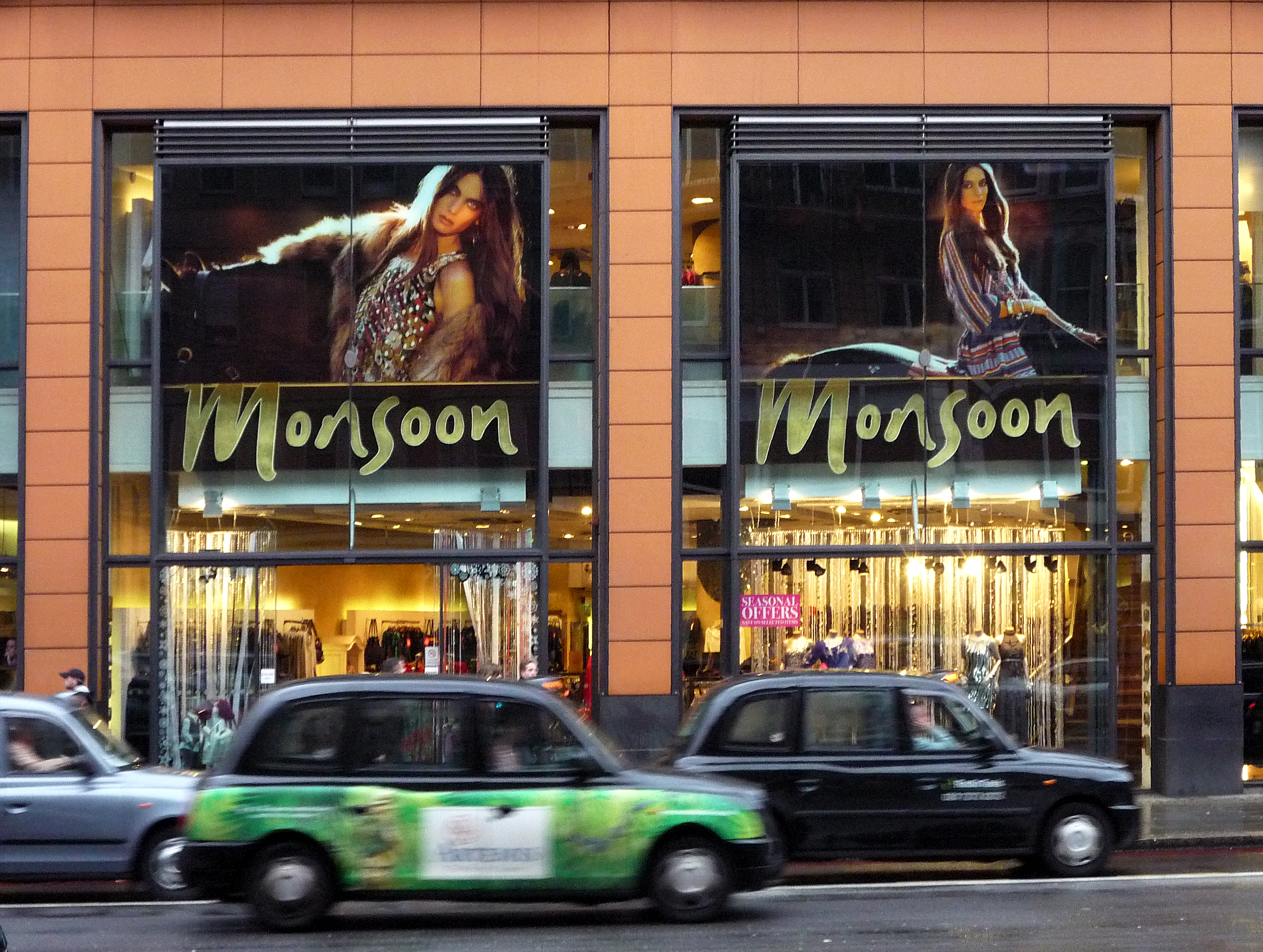
- Monsoon shop in Brompton Road, London
- Type: Private
- Industry: High Street retailer
- Founded: 1973; 53 years ago
- Founder: Peter Simon
- Headquarters: London, United Kingdom
- Number of locations: 181 stores
- Area served: United Kingdom
- Key people: Peter Simon (chairman); Nick Stowe (chief operating officer)
- Products: Clothing; Fashion accessory
- Owner: Peter Simon
- Divisions: Monsoon; Accessorize
- Website: monsoon.co.uk accessorize.com

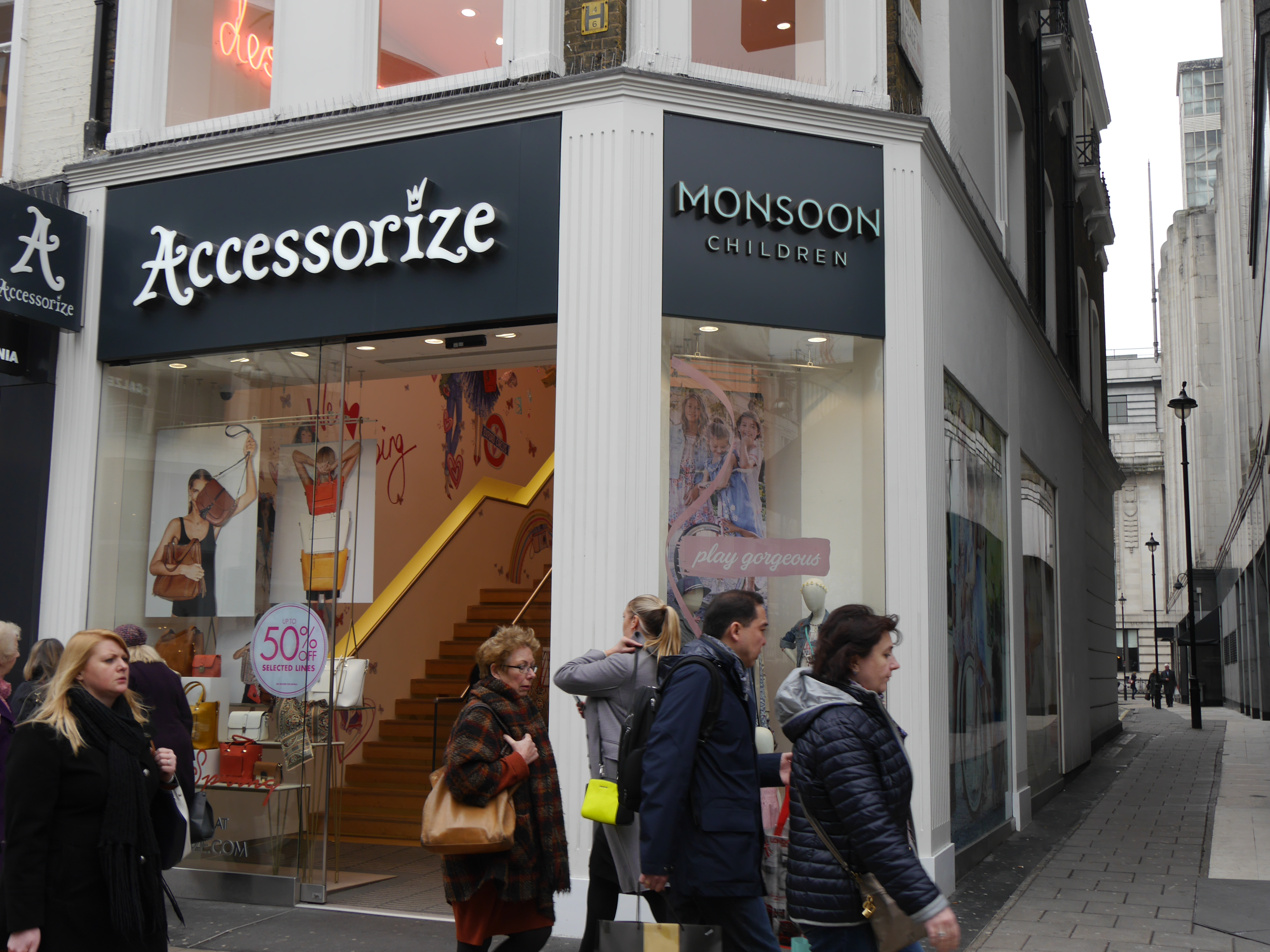
Monsoon Accessorize, Oxford Street, London, 2016

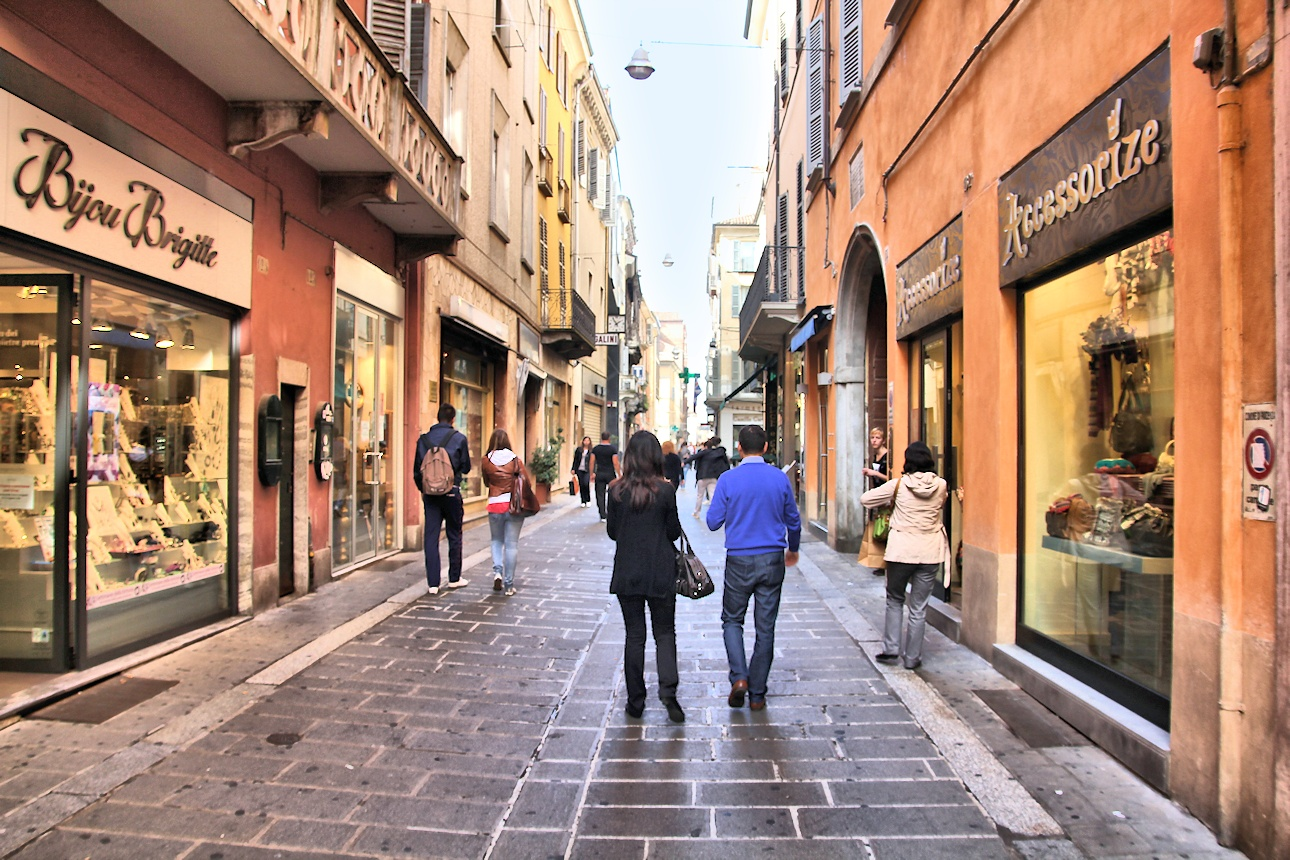
Accessorize store in Piacenza, Italy

Monsoon Accessorize is a British private limited company. It operates two international retail clothing chains – Monsoon and Accessorize.

In 2018, the company reported 181 stores in the UK and 19 in Italy.

== History ==
Monsoon was founded in London in 1973 by Peter Simon, a former market-stall trader, with a shop in Beauchamp Place. Simon, who was born in Sri Lanka, visited India and Afghanistan in the 1970s and began selling clothing based on fabrics and prints from the Indian subcontinent. The company's clothing has often been described as "boho-chic". The first Accessorize shop opened in 1984, next door to Monsoon in Covent Garden. In 1994, a registered charity, the Monsoon Accessorize Trust, was set up to help under-privileged women and children in Asia.

The company was listed on the Stock Exchange in 1998. In 2007, Simon paid £185 million to take it private again.

In 2009, the company moved to a building designed by Allford Hall Monaghan Morris in Notting Dale. The company's collection of some 300 works of modern and contemporary art is housed there. Monsoon also announced in 2009 that it would discontinue its limited menswear range to focus on clothing and accessories for women.

From early 2013 to February 2015, John Browett, former head of retail at Apple, was chief executive of the company. He was succeeded by Paul Allen, who served until August 2019, when Peter Simon and COO Nick Stowe jointly assumed the CEO role.

In the 12 months to August 2018, the company operated 181 stores in the UK. Filed accounts showed turnover of £296m, of which £62m came from overseas stores. The firm recorded a post-tax loss of £22.5m for the year.

In July 2019, a majority of Monsoon's landlords agreed to cut rents at 135 stores, following the retailer's proposed company voluntary arrangement.

On 10 June 2020, during the COVID pandemic, Monsoon Accessorize went into administration and was then bought out by Simon, who planned 35 UK store closures with the loss of 545 jobs. The company also confirmed the closure of Monsoon Accessorize stores in the Republic of Ireland affecting stores in Dublin, Cork City and Kilkenny. The company planned to retain stores in Drogheda, Limerick, Galway, Sligo and Athlone for the time being.

== Criticism ==
In February 2013, the Forum of Private Business criticised Monsoon for requiring all new suppliers to give a blanket rebate of up to 4% on all invoices, as well as a further charge of up to 10% for early payment.

In October 2015, Monsoon was at the head of a list published by HM Revenue and Customs of companies that had failed to pay the national minimum wage. Because of a policy requiring employees to wear Monsoon clothes at work, the cost of which was deducted from wages, the company had effectively underpaid 1,438 of its workers in the United Kingdom by over £104,000. The company was fined more than £28,000, and began paying a clothing allowance and raised wages.

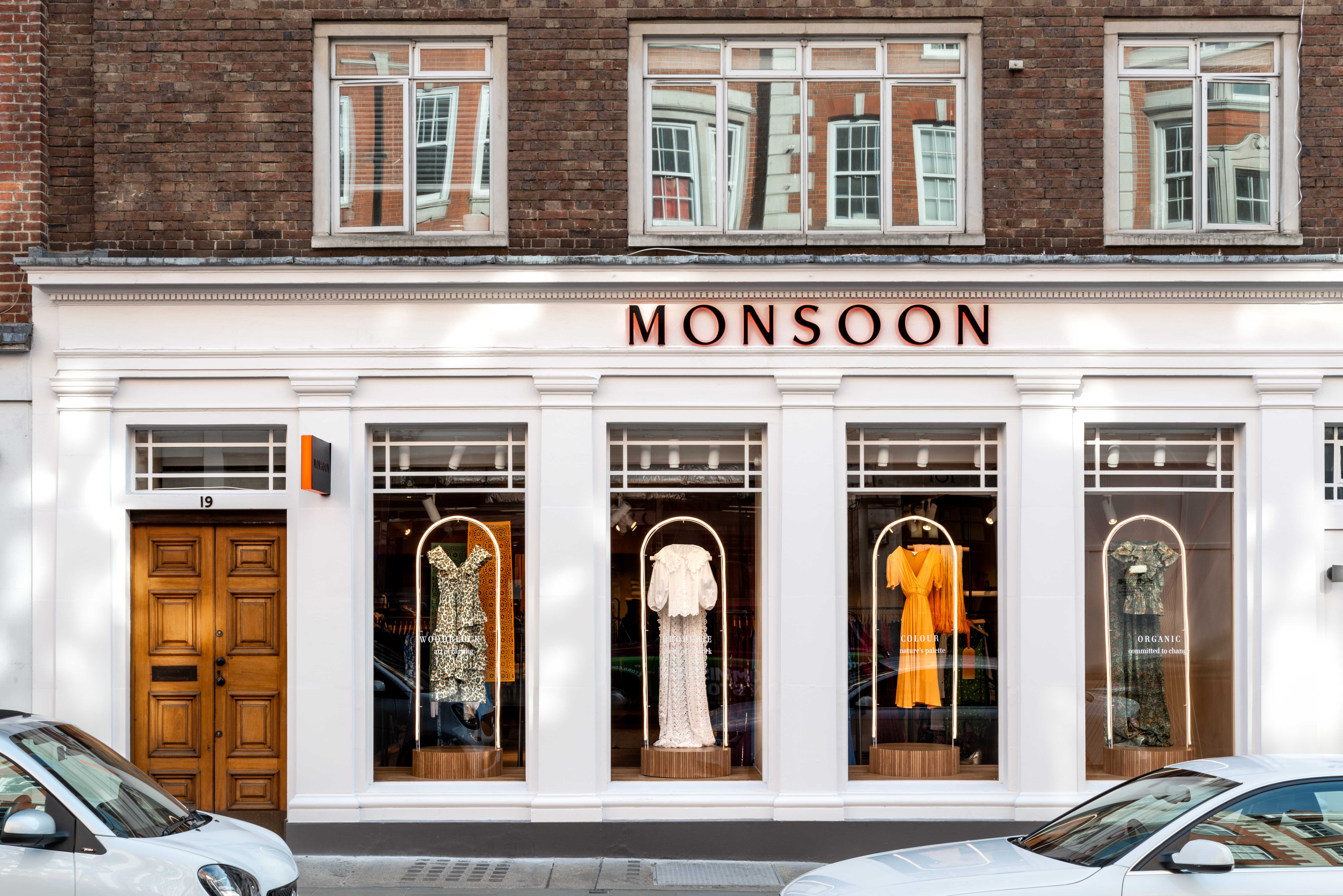
Monsoon Marylebone High Street
