= Peter Blunt =

British Army general

Major-General Peter Blunt CB MBE GM
- Born: 8 August 1923; Farnborough, England
- Died: 8 August 2003 (aged 80); London, England
- Spouse: Adrienne Richardson (m. 1949)
- Children: 3, including Crispin Blunt
- Relatives: Emily Blunt (granddaughter); Tony Richardson (brother-in-law)
- Military career
- Allegiance: United Kingdom
- Branch: British Army
- Service years: 1937–1946; 1949–1979
- Rank: Major-General
- Service number: 335303
- Commands: Transport Officer-in-Chief; 1st Corps, Royal Corps of Transport; 26 Regiment, Royal Corps of Transport
- Conflicts: Second World War: Italian Campaign
- Awards: Companion of the Order of the Bath; Member of the Order of the British Empire; George Medal
- Other work: Colonel-Commandant, Royal Corps of Transport (1974–1989)

Major-General Peter John Blunt, CB, MBE, GM (8 August 1923 – 8 August 2003) was a British Army officer and businessman. As a logistics officer in 1959, he was awarded the George Medal for risking his own life to save one of his drivers. He was the father of politician Crispin Blunt and grandfather of actress Emily Blunt.

== Early life ==
Born at Farnborough, Hampshire, into an army family, Blunt was the son of Claudia Mabel (née Wintle) and Albert Blunt, then a sergeant in the Royal Tank Corps. In 1929, his family moved to Kanpur, where he was educated. He left India in 1937 at the age of 14 to enroll as an apprentice tradesman in the Royal Army Service Corps (RASC) school on the island of Jersey.

== Military career ==
In 1940, after the fall of France, and with the German occupation of the Channel Islands imminent, the school was evacuated and Blunt found himself in an RASC training battalion in England. Shortly after his 18th birthday, he was sent to the Mediterranean theatre, but first won the lightweight inter-service boxing contest at Letchworth, Hertfordshire. He saw active service in the Italian campaign in 1944, before returning to England for officer training. He was then commissioned into the 2nd Battalion, The Royal Scots Fusiliers in November 1944 as a second lieutenant and commanded a close protection platoon defending Field Marshal Sir Bernard Montgomery's 21st Army Group headquarters. He was present at the signing of the unconditional German surrender at Lüneburg Heath on 4 May 1945.

During the Second World War, Blunt served also in the Duke of Cornwall's Light Infantry. After an appointment as adjutant of the British Army garrison in Dieppe, Blunt left the army in 1946 and joined the Allied Control Commission in Germany, then was an inspector at Bletchley Park. He briefly worked as an export manager of the Midland Metal Spinning Company in Wolverhampton but in 1949 returned to the army on a short-service commission in the Royal Electrical and Mechanical Engineers. As he was unable to advance without a university degree, Blunt transferred back to the Royal Army Service Corps in 1951 on a regular commission. He passed the Staff College, Camberley, in 1957, which opened up his career path as an officer.

In 1959, Blunt saved a driver whose lorry, carrying a load of petrol, crashed near Bielefeld, Germany. While the injured driver was trapped in the cab, Blunt—with disregard for his own safety—climbed into the cab and applied a tourniquet to the driver's badly injured leg and administered morphine. Despite the risk of fire, Blunt stayed with the injured and frightened man for an hour, until he was cut from the vehicle. He was awarded the George Medal for his courage and humanitarian action.

Blunt passed the Joint Services Staff College in 1963, and then in 1965 was sent to command 26 (Heavy Ferry) Bridging Regiment and, by some accounts, to resolve a mutiny. Later that year the unit became 26 Regiment, Royal Corps of Transport. In 1968 he was appointed General Staff Officer 1 for Defence Plans, Far East Land Forces, and from 1970 to 1972 commanded the Royal Corps of Transport 1st Corps, before being seconded to the Royal College of Defence Studies in 1972.

After service as Deputy Transport Officer-in-Chief for the Army, Blunt became Transport Officer-in-Chief in 1973, then was Assistant Chief of Personnel and Logistics (Army) at the Ministry of Defence in 1977–78 and Assistant Chief of Defence Staff (Personnel and Logistics), 1978–79, when he retired the service, while continuing in the ceremonial role of Colonel Commandant of the Royal Corps of Transport (1974–1989).

== Corporate career ==
Entering the world of business, Blunt was managing director of Earls Court Ltd., 1979–80, Angex-Watson, 1980–83, and Market Sensors, 1980–88. He was Chairman of Angex Ltd., 1988–90, and of Argus Shield Ltd., 1988–89. He was also a director of Associated Newspapers.

Blunt was a special Commissioner of the Royal Hospital, Chelsea, from 1979 to 1985, and a liveryman of the Worshipful Company of Carmen from 1973. His address at the time of his death was Harefield House, Ramsbury, in Wiltshire.

== Family ==
In 1949, Blunt married Adrienne, the daughter of Major-General T. W. Richardson, and they had three sons, including Oliver Blunt KC, and Crispin Blunt, Conservative Member of Parliament for Reigate. His grandchildren include the actress Emily Blunt.
