= 2021 Surrey County Council election =

2021 UK local government election

- 6 May 2021

All 81 seats to Surrey County Council 41 seats needed for a majority
- Turnout: 39% (▲3%)

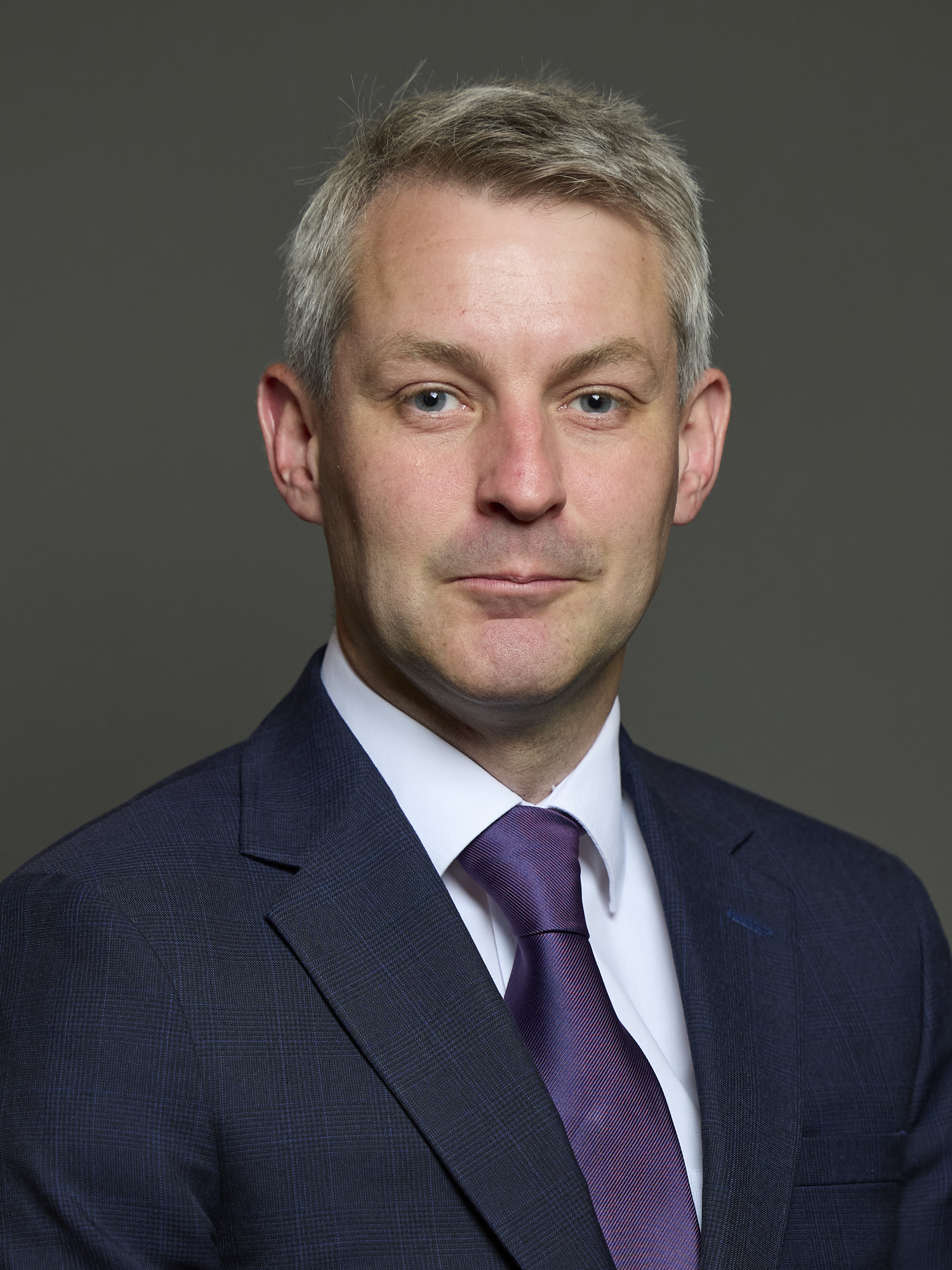

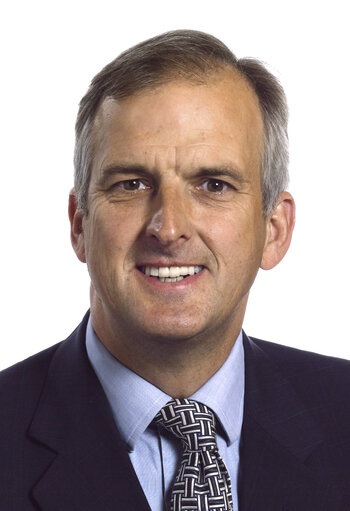

	First party	Second party	Third party
Leader	Tim Oliver	Will Forster	Nick Darby
Party	Conservative	Liberal Democrats	Residents
Last election	61 seats	9 seats	8 seats
Seats won	47	14	12
Seat change	▼14	▲5	▲4
Popular vote	144,940	84,882	32,854
Percentage	42.2%	24.7%	9.6%
Swing	▼6.5%	▲1.7%	N/A
	Fourth party	Fifth party	Sixth party
Leader		Robert Evans
Party	Independent	Labour	Green
Last election	1 seat	1 seat	1 seat
Seats won	4	2	2
Seat change	▲3	▲1	▲1
Popular vote	17,828	39,019	20,121
Percentage	5.2%	11.4%	5.9%
Swing	N/A	▲1.9%	▲1.7%
- Map showing the results of the election in each division

The 2021 Surrey County Council election took place on 6 May 2021, alongside other English and Welsh local elections. Councillors were elected for all 81 single-member electoral divisions of Surrey County Council for a four-year term. The electoral system used was first-past-the-post voting.

The result was that Conservative councillors formed a significantly decreased majority on the council, losing a net 14 seats. Although they retained a very secure majority of 13 seats over and above all other Parties (47 seats to 34 seats), this was nevertheless the worst result for the Conservatives since 1993.

The Liberal Democrats gained five seats overall, making them the largest party on the council after the Conservatives, but an informal alliance of Independent and Residents‘ Parties and councillors became the largest opposition group on the council with 16 councillors in total, a net increase of seven.

The Labour Party and the Green Party of England and Wales both doubled their representation, going from one to two councillors each.

In all, sixteen divisions changed hands at the election, with the Conservatives gaining 1 seat and losing 15 seats compared to the previous SCC election of 2017.

The 2021 election was the last election for Surrey County Council before the council's abolition on 1 April 2027.

The 2025 election cycle for Surrey County Council was cancelled owing to the proposal to replace the Council (and the eleven borough and district councils across Surrey) with a unitary model of local government for the county.

== Summary ==
=== Election result ===
2021 Surrey County Council election
Party	Candidates	Seats	Gains	Losses	Net gain/loss	Seats %	Votes %	Votes	+/−
Conservative	81	47	1	15	▼14	58.0	42.2	144,940	–6.5
Liberal Democrats	72	14	6	1	▲5	17.3	24.7	84,882	+1.7
Independent	20	4	3	0	▲3	4.9	5.2	17,828	
Residents Association	5	4	1	0	▲1	4.9	2.9	9,919	
Residents	4	3	0	0	Steady	3.7	2.5	8,456	
Farnham Residents	3	3	1	0	▲1	3.7	1.9	6,548	
Labour	79	2	1	0	▲1	2.5	11.4	39,019	+1.9
Green	36	2	1	0	▲1	2.5	5.9	20,121	+1.7
R4GV	5	2	2	0	▲2	2.5	2.3	7,931	N/A
GGG	1	0	0	0	Steady	0.0	0.4	1,540	
UKIP	5	0	0	0	Steady	0.0	0.2	656	–4.7
Reform	6	0	0	0	Steady	0.0	0.2	631	N/A
Heritage	5	0	0	0	Steady	0.0	0.2	541	N/A
TUSC	5	0	0	0	Steady	0.0	0.1	255	
Peace	1	0	0	0	Steady	0.0	<0.1	140	
Workers Party	2	0	0	0	Steady	0.0	<0.1	103	N/A

=== By successor council ===
The 2021 election was the final election to Surrey County Council as a whole prior to its dissolution into East Surrey and West Surrey for the 2026 election. The results for the boroughs which would become East Surrey and West Surrey respectively were as follows:

East Surrey
Party	Seats	Votes	%
Conservative	22	67,756	42.2
Residents of Epsom and Ewell	4	9,919	6.2
Liberal Democrats	3	37,823	23.6
Residents	3	7,429	6.6
Green	2	12,109	7.5
Independent	2	7,808	4.9
Labour	0	17,160	10.7
Reform UK	0	340	0.2
UKIP	0	215	0.1
Workers Party	0	17	0.01
Total	36	160,576	

West Surrey
Party	Seats	Net gain/loss	Votes	%	+- (%)
Conservative	25	▼12	77,184	42.2	-8.7
Liberal Democrats	11	▲6	47,059	25.7	+2.6
Farnham Residents	3	▲1	6,548	3.6	+0.6
Labour	2	▲1	21,859	11.9	+1.0
Independent	2	▲2	10,020	5.5	+2.9
R4GV	2	▲2	7,931	4.3	N/A
Green	0	N/A	8,012	4.4	+0.8
GGG	0	N/A	1,540	0.8	+0.6
Residents	0	N/A	1,027	0.6	+0.1
Heritage	0	N/A	541	0.3	N/A
UKIP	0	N/A	441	0.2	-5.2
Reform UK	0	N/A	291	0.2	N/A
TUSC	0	N/A	255	0.1	+0.1
Peace Party	0	N/A	140	0.1	+0.1
Workers Party	0	N/A	86	0.1	N/A
Total	45	182,934			

== Results by division ==
Incumbent councillors are denoted by *

=== Elmbridge ===
Elmbridge district summary
Party	Seats	+/-	Votes	%	+/-
Conservative	7	Steady	19,229	46.0	–9.6
Residents	2	Steady	4,666	11.2	–2.1
Liberal Democrats	0	Steady	12,944	31.0	+8.9
Labour	0	Steady	3,566	8.5	+4.1
Green	0	Steady	769	1.8	–0.3
Independent	0	Steady	348	0.8	N/A
Reform UK	0	Steady	259	0.6	N/A
Total	9	Steady	41,781		

Division results

Cobham
Party	Candidate	Votes	%	±%
Conservative	David John Lewis	2,601	65.6	−1
Liberal Democrats	David Colin Bellchamber	1,087	27.4	+7
Labour	Irene Threlkeld	279	7.0	0
Majority		1,514	38.2	−8
Rejected ballots		25		
Turnout		3,992	37.6	+5
Conservative hold		Swing	▼4.0	

East Molesey and Esher
Party	Candidate	Votes	%	±%
Conservative	Steve Bax	2,520	54.2	0
Liberal Democrats	Bruce Robert McDonald	1,429	30.7	+23
Green	Laura Jayne Harmour	472	10.1	+7
Labour	Richard Cranstone Bennett	230	4.9	+1
Majority		1,091	23.5	−1
Rejected ballots		28		
Turnout		4,679	45.3	+5
Conservative hold		Swing	▼11.5	

Hersham
Party	Candidate	Votes	%	±%
Conservative	John O'Reilly*	2,424	59.0	+5
Liberal Democrats	Chester Robert Chandler	1,115	27.1	+20
Labour	Jeremy Daniel Brown	570	13.9	+6
Majority		1,309	31.9	+3
Rejected ballots		39		
Turnout		4,148	38.7	+1
Conservative hold		Swing	▼7.5	

Hinchley Wood, Claygate and Oxshott
Party	Candidate	Votes	%	±%
Conservative	Mark Sugden	2,760	46.9	−3
Liberal Democrats	Sue Grose	2,607	44.3	−3
Reform	Mike Bennison*	259	4.4	+4
Labour	Frederick Albert Green	254	4.3	+4
Majority		153	2.6	0
Rejected ballots		34		
Turnout		5,914	47.3	+7
Conservative hold		Swing	0.0	

Mike Bennison was previously elected as a Conservative.

UKIP stood in 2017. Labour and Reform UK did not stand in 2017.

The Dittons
Party	Candidate	Votes	%	±%
Dittons and Weston Green Residents	Nick Darby*	2,744	49.7	-7
Liberal Democrats	David Gattey	1,239	22.4	+6
Conservative	Nicholas Weber	1,014	18.4	−5
Green	Greg Knowles	297	5.4	+5
Labour	Ahmad Ali	229	4.1	−1
Majority		1,505	27.2	−6
Rejected ballots		30		
Turnout		5,538	46.1	+8
Dittons and Weston Green Residents hold		Swing	▼6.5	

Walton
Party	Candidate	Votes	%	±%
Conservative	Rachael Lake*	2,012	48.1	−5
Liberal Democrats	Damien Nolan	1,446	34.6	+13
Labour	Peter Ashurst	723	17.3	−1
Majority		566	13.5	−18
Rejected ballots		56		
Turnout		4,237	36.0	+6
Conservative hold		Swing	▼9.0	

Walton South and Oatlands
Party	Candidate	Votes	%	±%
Conservative	Tony Samuels*	2,475	53.6	−8
Liberal Democrats	Peter Hampson	1,692	36.6	+14
Labour	Warren Weertman	450	9.7	0
Majority		783	17.0	−22
Rejected ballots		40		
Turnout		4,657	41.3	+7
Conservative hold		Swing	▼11.0	

West Molesey
Party	Candidate	Votes	%	±%
The Molesey Residents Association	Ernest Mallett*	1,922	47.4	-2
Conservative	Charu Sood	1,039	25.6	−8
Liberal Democrats	David Nickerson	719	17.7	+13
Labour	Jamal Ajjane	375	9.2	+2
Majority		883	21.8	+6
Rejected ballots		25		
Turnout		4,080	39.4	+4
The Molesey Residents Association hold		Swing	▲3.0	

Weybridge
Party	Candidate	Votes	%	±%
Conservative	Tim Oliver*	2,384	49.7	0
Liberal Democrats	Ashley Tilling	1,610	33.6	−2
Labour	Helen Pilmer	456	9.5	+5
Independent	Nicholas Wood	348	7.3	+7
Majority		774	16.1	+2
Rejected ballots		36		
Turnout		4,834	41.1	+5
Conservative hold		Swing	▲1.0	

=== Epsom and Ewell ===
Epsom & Ewell district summary
Party	Seats	+/-	Votes	%	+/-
Residents	4	▲1	9,919	44.8	–1.4
Conservative	1	▼1	5,074	22.9	–4.1
Labour	0	Steady	3,061	13.8	+2.6
Liberal Democrats	0	Steady	3,015	13.6	+1.0
Green	0	Steady	1,048	4.7	+1.8
Workers Party	0	Steady	17	0.1	N/A
Total	5	Steady	22,134		

Division results

Epsom Town and Downs
Party	Candidate	Votes	%	±%
Residents Association	Steven McCormick	1,436	28.7	−3
Conservative	Emma Ware	1,427	28.6	−13
Liberal Democrats	Julie Morris	1,304	26.1	+11
Labour	Sarah Kenyon	494	9.9	+2
Green	Janice Baker	319	6.4	+3
Workers Party	Kier Kirby	17	0.3	0
Majority		9	0.2	−9.9
Rejected ballots		25		
Turnout		5,022	42.6	
Residents Association gain from Conservatives		Swing	▲5.0	

Epsom West
Party	Candidate	Votes	%	±%
Conservative	Bernie Muir*	1,518	32.8	+3
Labour	Mark Todd	1,172	25.3	+4
Residents Associations of Epsom and Ewell	Neil Dallen	1,029	22.2	+4
Liberal Democrats	Steve Gee	913	19.7	−8
Majority		346	7.5	+6
Rejected ballots		28		
Turnout		4,660	40.6	+4
Conservative hold		Swing	▼0.5	

Ewell
Party	Candidate	Votes	%	±%
Residents Association	John Beckett*	2,699	62.1	−4
Conservative	Jamie Abrahams	797	18.3	−1
Labour	Jason Anderson	407	9.4	+2
Liberal Democrats	David Gulland	241	5.5	0
Green	Steve McDonald	200	4.6	+3
Majority		1,902	43.8	−3
Rejected ballots		17		
Turnout		4,361	35.4	+2
Residents Associations of Epsom and Ewell hold		Swing	▼1.5	

Ewell Court, Auriol and Cuddington
Party	Candidate	Votes	%	±%
Residents Association	Eber Kington*	2,974	66.4	−2
Conservative	George Bushati	629	14.0	−5
Labour	Amos Sibanda	311	6.9	+1
Liberal Democrats	Dan Brown	297	6.6	+3
Green	Sarah Clayton	266	5.9	+4
Majority		2,345	52.4	+3
Rejected ballots		32		
Turnout		4,509	37.4	+3
Residents Association of Epsom and Ewell hold		Swing	▲1.5	

West Ewell
Party	Candidate	Votes	%	±%
Residents Association	Jan Mason*	1,781	48.3	−3
Conservative	Kieran Persand	703	19.1	−4
Labour	Rob Geleit	677	18.4	+3
Green	Tony Foster	263	7.1	+4
Liberal Democrats	Alison Kelly	260	7.1	−2
Majority		1,078	29.3	+1
Rejected ballots		27		
Turnout		3,711	31.4	+4
Residents Association of Epsom and Ewell hold		Swing	▲0.5	

=== Guildford ===
Guildford district summary
Party	Seats	+/-	Votes	%	+/-
Liberal Democrats	5	▲2	10,920	26.8	–5.5
Conservative	3	▼4	15,212	37.3	–12.1
R4GV	2	▲2	7,931	19.4	N/A
Labour	0	Steady	4,188	10.3	+0.1
GGG	0	Steady	1,540	3.8	+2.7
Green	0	Steady	862	2.1	–3.0
Peace	0	Steady	140	0.3	+0.1
Total	10	Steady	40,793		

Division results

Ash
Party	Candidate	Votes	%	±%
Liberal Democrats	Carla Morson	2,025	55.8	+36
Conservative	Nigel Manning	1,326	36.6	−24
Labour	Peter Kimber	276	7.6	−1
Majority		699	19.3	
Turnout		3,650	36.7	+9
Liberal Democrats gain from Conservative		Swing	▲30.0	

Guildford East
Party	Candidate	Votes	%	±%
Liberal Democrats	George Potter	1,503	32.3	−3
R4GV	Liz Hyland	1,421	30.5	+31
Conservative	Philip Brooker	1,328	28.5	−16
Labour	Sue Hackman	405	8.7	−3
Majority		82	1.8	
Rejected ballots		15		
Turnout		4,672	44.7	+4
Liberal Democrats gain from Conservative		Swing	▼14.0	

Guildford North
Party	Candidate	Votes	%	±%
Liberal Democrats	Julia McShane	1,602	44.2	+2
Conservative	Chris O'Keeffe	1,283	35.4	+2
Labour	Anne Rouse	743	20.5	+1
Majority		319	8.8	0
Rejected ballots		32		
Turnout		3,660	33.9	0
Liberal Democrats hold		Swing	0.0	

Guildford South-East
Party	Candidate	Votes	%	±%
R4GV	Fiona Davidson	1,749	37.7	+38
Conservative	Mark Brett-Warburton*	1,432	30.9	−20
Liberal Democrats	Cengiz Harwood	1,077	23.2	−17
Labour	Joseph Dewar	381	8.2	−1
Majority		317	6.8	
Rejected ballots		15		
Turnout		4,654	44.1	+4
R4GV gain from Conservative		Swing	▲29.0	

Guildford South-West
Party	Candidate	Votes	%	±%
Liberal Democrats	Angela Goodwin	2,009	47.2	−4
Conservative	Sallie Barker	852	20.0	−11
R4GV	Lucy Connor	819	19.2	+19
Labour	Jacob Allen	580	13.6	+5
Majority		1,157	27.2	+7
Rejected ballots		17		
Turnout		4,277	41.1	+4
Liberal Democrats hold		Swing	▲3.5	

Guildford West
Party	Candidate	Votes	%	±%
Liberal Democrats	Fiona White*	1,020	42.6	0
Conservative	Dorothy Chalklin	656	27.4	+1
Labour	Brian Creese	577	24.1	−2
Peace	John Morris	140	5.9	+4
Majority		364	15.2	−1
Rejected ballots		17		
Turnout		2,410	24.1	−5
Liberal Democrats hold		Swing	▼0.5	

Horsleys
Party	Candidate	Votes	%	±%
R4GV	Colin Cross	2,214	47.8	+48
Conservative	Julie Iles*	1,735	37.4	−17
Liberal Democrats	Elizabeth Daly	536	11.6	−26
Labour	Peter Horitz	149	3.2	+1
Majority		479	10.3	
Rejected ballots		16		
Turnout		4,650	46.8	+1
R4GV gain from Conservative		Swing	▲32.5	

Shalford
Party	Candidate	Votes	%	±%
Conservative	Matt Furniss*	2,408	56.0	+1
R4GV	Cecilia Taylor	1,015	23.6	+24
Liberal Democrats	Philip Buckley	529	12.3	−1
Labour	Susannah Patrick	350	8.1	+1
Majority		1,393	32.4	−6
Rejected ballots		19		
Turnout		4,321	35.6	+1
Conservative hold		Swing	▼11.5	

Shere
Party	Candidate	Votes	%	±%
Conservative	Robert Hughes	1,618	37.2	−25
GGG	Julia Osborn	1,540	35.4	+35
Green	Sam Peters	862	19.8	+9
Labour	John Marsh	326	7.5	+1
Majority		78	1.8	−40
Rejected ballots		27		
Turnout		4,373	44.1	+7
Conservative hold		Swing	▼30.0	

Worplesdon
Party	Candidate	Votes	%	±%
Conservative	Keith Witham*	2,574	59.8	−9
R4GV	Gina Redpath	713	16.6	+17
Liberal Democrats	Philippa Dolan	619	14.4	−3
Labour	Amanda Creese	401	9.3	0
Majority		1,861	43.2	−9
Rejected ballots		17		
Turnout		4,324	39.4	+3
Conservative hold		Swing	▼13.0	

=== Mole Valley ===
Mole Valley district summary
Party	Seats	+/-	Votes	%	+/-
Conservative	3	Steady	11,840	39.1	–2.5
Liberal Democrats	2	Steady	11,538	38.1	+0.6
Independent	1	Steady	2,908	9.6	+0.1
Green	0	Steady	2,394	7.9	+3.8
Labour	0	Steady	1,529	5.0	+1.5
Reform UK	0	Steady	81	0.3	N/A
Total	6	Steady	30,290		

Division results

Ashtead
Party	Candidate	Votes	%	±%
Ashtead Independent	Chris Townsend	2,908	59.1	+5
Conservative	Marion Brigden	1,092	22.2	−13
Liberal Democrats	Collette 'T Hart	361	7.3	+3
Green	Izzy Tod	285	5.8	+4
Labour	Susan Gilchrist	271	5.5	+2
Majority		1,816	36.9	
Turnout			43.4	
Ashtead Independent hold		Swing	▲9.0	

Bookham and Fetcham West
Party	Candidate	Votes	%	±%
Conservative	Clare Curran	2,907	47.8	−3
Liberal Democrats	Raj Haque	2,603	42.8	+2
Green	John Roche	316	5.2	+1
Labour	Laurence Nasskau	173	2.8	+3
Reform	Terry Moody	81	1.3	+1
Majority		304	5.0	−5
Rejected ballots		32		
Turnout		6,113	50.7	−5
Conservative hold		Swing	▼2.5	

Dorking Hills
Party	Candidate	Votes	%	±%
Liberal Democrats	Hazel Watson	2,989	58.6	+2
Conservative	Gavin Musgrave	1,510	29.6	−3
Green	Chris Crook	414	8.1	+4
Labour	Samuel Cockle-Hearne	188	3.7	+1
Majority		1,479	29.0	
Turnout			47.3	
Liberal Democrats hold		Swing	▲2.5	

Dorking Rural
Party	Candidate	Votes	%	±%
Conservative	Helyn Clack	2,416	49.2	−5
Liberal Democrats	Claire Malcomson	1,864	37.9	+3
Green	Lisa Scott	509	10.4	+7
Labour	Christine Foster	126	2.6	0
Majority		552	11.2	
Turnout			44.5	
Conservative hold		Swing	▼4.0	

Dorking South and the Holmwoods
Party	Candidate	Votes	%	±%
Liberal Democrats	Stephen Cooksey	2,406	54.7	+4
Conservative	Roger Jones	1,282	29.2	−4
Green	Hayley Baines-Buffery	427	9.7	+4
Labour	Kev Stroud	281	6.4	+1
Majority		1,124	25.6	
Turnout			42.5	
Liberal Democrats hold		Swing	▲4.0	

Leatherhead and Fetcham East
Party	Candidate	Votes	%	±%
Conservative	Tim Hall	2,633	53.9	+1
Liberal Democrats	Jane De Silva	1,315	26.9	−2
Labour	Ann Clark	490	10.0	+2
Green	Tracey Harwood	443	9.1	+6
Majority		1,318	27.0	
Turnout			40.6	
Conservative hold		Swing	▲1.5	

=== Reigate and Banstead ===
Reigate & Banstead district summary
Party	Seats	+/-	Votes	%	+/-
Conservative	7	▼1	19,289	48.6	–1.5
Green	2	▲1	7,055	17.8	+5.9
Residents	1	Steady	2,763	7.0	±0.0
Labour	0	Steady	6,404	16.1	+5.4
Liberal Democrats	0	Steady	4,107	10.3	–3.1
UKIP	0	Steady	110	0.3	–6.5
Total	10	Steady	39,728		

Division results

Banstead, Woodmansterne and Chipstead
Party	Candidate	Votes	%	±%
Conservative	Luke Bennett	2,811	68.8	+2
Labour	Ian Thirlwall	655	16.0	+8
Liberal Democrats	Mark Johnston	621	15.2	0
Majority		2156	52.8	
Rejected ballots		41		
Turnout		4,128	38.3	
Conservative hold		Swing	▼3.0	

Earlswood and Reigate South
Party	Candidate	Votes	%	±%
Green	Catherine Baart	1,736	44.6	+36
Conservative	Barbara Thomson	1,612	41.4	−7
Labour	Rex Giles	548	14.1	−5
Majority		124	3.2	
Rejected ballots		26		
Turnout		3,922	37.7	
Green gain from Conservative		Swing	▲21.5	

Horley East
Party	Candidate	Votes	%	±%
Conservative	Jordan Beech	2,034	57.0	−3
Labour	Tom Turner	820	23.0	+8
Green	Shasha Khan	716	20.1	+15
Majority		1214	34.0	
Rejected ballots		42		
Turnout		3,612	34.4	
Conservative hold		Swing	▼5.5	

Horley West, Salfords and Sidlow
Party	Candidate	Votes	%	±%
Conservative	Andy Lynch	2,281	65.8	+11
Labour	Lynnette Easterbrook	1,185	34.2	+20
Majority		1096	31.6	
Rejected ballots		60		
Turnout		3,526	31.3	
Conservative hold		Swing	▼4.5	

Merstham and Banstead South
Party	Candidate	Votes	%	±%
Conservative	Frank Kelly	2,052	56.7	+2
Labour	Shaka Aklilu	752	20.8	+5
Liberal Democrats	Jemma De Vincenzo	414	11.4	−5
Green	Kumari Lane	399	11.0	+5
Majority		1,300	35.9	
Rejected ballots		43		
Turnout		3,660	35.7	
Conservative hold		Swing	▼1.5	

Nork and Tattenhams
Party	Candidate	Votes	%	±%
Nork and Tattenhams Residents` Associations	Nick Harrison	2,763	63.8	0
Conservative	Ohis Ilalokhoin	908	21.0	−4
Labour	Ros Godson	302	7.0	+3
Green	Alistair Morten	197	4.5	+3
Liberal Democrats	Andrew Knights	162	3.7	−1
Majority		1,855	42.8	
Rejected ballots		29		
Turnout		4,361	35.8	
Nork and Tattenhams Residents` Associations hold		Swing	▲2.0	

Redhill East
Party	Candidate	Votes	%	±%
Green	Jonathan Essex	2,622	65.3	+12
Conservative	Adam Lehodey	844	21.0	−4
Labour	Mick Hay	407	10.1	0
Liberal Democrats	Peter Lambell	144	3.6	−3
Majority		1,778	44.3	
Rejected ballots		23		
Turnout		4,040	39.4	
Green hold		Swing	▲8.0	

Redhill West and Meadvale
Party	Candidate	Votes	%	±%
Conservative	Natalie Bramhall	1,726	43.4	0
Liberal Democrats	Steve Kulka	1,309	32.9	+13
Labour	Mark Smith	829	20.9	+10
UKIP	Alastair Richardson	110	2.8	−1
Majority		415	10.4	
Rejected ballots		28		
Turnout		4,002	38.7	
Conservative hold		Swing	▼6.5	

Reigate
Party	Candidate	Votes	%	±%
Conservative	Victor Lewanski	2,146	46.1	−6
Liberal Democrats	John Vincent	1,101	23.7	−7
Green	Paul Chandler	948	20.4	+13
Labour	Tony Robinson	456	9.8	+4
Majority		1,045	22.5	
Rejected ballots		24		
Turnout		4,675	43.7	
Conservative hold		Swing	▲0.5	

Tadworth, Walton and Kingswood
Party	Candidate	Votes	%	±%
Conservative	Rebecca Paul	2,875	69.8	−1
Labour	Steve Boeje	450	10.9	+4
Green	Roger Ponsford	437	10.6	+5
Liberal Democrats	Christopher Thompson	356	8.6	0
Majority		2,425	58.9	
Rejected ballots		19		
Turnout		4,137	36.2	
Conservative hold		Swing	▼2.5	

=== Runnymede ===
Runnymede district summary
Party	Seats	+/-	Votes	%	+/-
Conservative	5	▼1	10,212	49.2	–6.9
Labour	1	▲1	4,056	19.6	+4.8
Liberal Democrats	0	Steady	2,756	13.3	+2.0
Independent	0	Steady	1,783	8.6	N/A
Residents	0	Steady	1,027	5.0	+0.6
Green	0	Steady	824	4.0	–0.5
TUSC	0	Steady	78	0.4	N/A
Total	6	Steady	20,736		

Division results

Addlestone
Party	Candidate	Votes	%	±%
Conservative	John Raymond Furey*	1,777	50.1	−4
Labour	Michael William Scott	674	19.0	0
Green	Christopher George Martin John	505	14.2	+7
Liberal Democrats	Rudiger Rodrigo Dikty-Daudiyan	289	8.1	−2
Independent	Tommy Traylen	224	6.3	+6
TUSC	Lisa Jane Allen	78	2.2	+2
Majority		1,103	31.1	−4
Rejected ballots		40		
Turnout		3,587	31.4	0
Conservative hold		Swing	▼2.0	

Chertsey
Party	Candidate	Votes	%	±%
Conservative	Mark Gordon Nuti*	2,105	60.4	+1
Labour	Philip James Martin	739	21.2	+2
Liberal Democrats	Sylvia Jane Whyte	641	18.4	+7
Majority		1,366	39.2	−1
Rejected ballots		40		
Turnout		3,525	31.5	0
Conservative hold		Swing	▼0.5	

Egham
Party	Candidate	Votes	%	±%
Labour Co-op	Robert Ashley King	1,101	39.3	+18
Conservative	Nick Prescot	1,007	36.0	−13
Independent	Mike Kusneraitis	461	16.5	+16
Liberal Democrats	Ian David Heath	230	8.2	−5
Majority		94	3.4	
Rejected ballots		27		
Turnout		2,826	35.3	+7
Labour Co-op gain from Conservative		Swing	▲15.5	

Englefield Green
Party	Candidate	Votes	%	±%
Conservative	Marisa Heath*	1,171	36.0	−5
Runnymede Independent Residents' Group	Isabel Alice Mullens	1,027	31.5	+3
Labour	Dominic John Breen	580	17.8	+7
Green	Maciej Pawlik	319	9.8	+5
Liberal Democrats	Blake Kwong	159	4.9	−4
Majority		144	4.4	−8
Rejected ballots		32		
Turnout		3,288	29.8	+1
Conservative hold		Swing	▼4.0	

Foxhills, Thorpe and Virginia Water
Party	Candidate	Votes	%	±%
Conservative	Jonathan Hulley	2,098	49.3	−16
Independent	Malcolm David Cressey	1,098	25.8	+26
Liberal Democrats	Donald James Whyte	645	15.2	+2
Labour	Karen McKinlay-Gunn	416	9.8	+1
Majority		1,000	23.5	−29
Rejected ballots		43		
Turnout		4,300	40.0	+6
Conservative hold		Swing	▼21.0	

Woodham and New Haw
Party	Candidate	Votes	%	±%
Conservative	Scott Alderson Lewis	2,054	60.6	−2
Liberal Democrats	Kevin James Decruz	792	23.3	+11
Labour	Bernie Charles Stacey	546	16.1	+6
Majority		1,262	37.2	−13
Rejected ballots		28		
Turnout		3,420	34.5	−2
Conservative hold		Swing	▼6.5	

=== Spelthorne ===
Spelthorne district summary
Party	Seats	+/-	Votes	%	+/-
Conservative	5	▼1	11,440	43.2	–4.2
Labour	1	Steady	4,649	17.5	+0.7
Independent	1	▲1	3,045	11.5	+7.4
Liberal Democrats	0	Steady	4,272	16.1	–0.1
Green	0	Steady	2,837	10.7	+7.3
TUSC	0	Steady	120	0.5	+0.3
Total	7	Steady	26,510		

Division results

Ashford
Party	Candidate	Votes	%	±%
Independent	Joanne Sexton	1,461	37.1	+37
Conservative	Naz Islam	1,279	32.5	−15
Labour	Iain Raymond	558	14.2	−1
Green	Malcolm Beecher	407	10.3	+5
Liberal Democrats	Caroline Nichols	232	5.9	−1
Majority		182	4.6	
Turnout			36.6	
Independent gain from Conservative		Swing	▲26.0	

Laleham and Shepperton
Party	Candidate	Votes	%	±%
Conservative	Maureen Attewell	2,477	59.9	+6
Green	Paul Hollingworth	752	18.2	+14
Labour	Jon Button	473	11.4	+1
Liberal Democrats	Sandra Dunn	398	9.6	+1
TUSC	Helen Couchman	37	0.9	+1
Majority		1,725	41.7	
Turnout			38.8	
Conservative hold		Swing	▼4.0	

Lower Sunbury and Halliford
Party	Candidate	Votes	%	±%
Conservative	Buddhi Weerasinghe	1,691	40.5	−10
Liberal Democrats	Lawrence Nichols	1,661	39.8	+8
Green	Chris Hyde	434	10.4	+7
Labour	Sean Beatty	388	9.3	+1
Majority		30	0.7	
Turnout			38.6	
Conservative hold		Swing	▼9.0	

Staines
Party	Candidate	Votes	%	±%
Conservative	Sinead Mooney	1,387	33.0	−8
Independent	Denise Saliagopoulos	1,107	26.3	+6
Green	Tom Lagden	970	23.1	+17
Labour	Daisy Gill	738	17.6	+2
Majority		280	6.7	
Turnout			38.8	
Conservative hold		Swing	▼7.0	

Staines South and Ashford West
Party	Candidate	Votes	%	±%
Conservative	Denise Turner Stewart	1,866	50.1	−3
Liberal Democrats	Chris Bateson	1,238	33.3	+21
Labour	Tim Lobanov	536	14.4	−2
TUSC	Sue Bryer	83	2.2	+2
Majority		628	16.9	
Turnout			34.3	
Conservative hold		Swing	▼12.0	

Stanwell and Stanwell Moor
Party	Candidate	Votes	%	±%
Labour	Robert Evans	1,434	46.3	0
Conservative	Jim McIlroy	1,231	39.7	+2
Independent	Sam Bradley	302	9.7	+10
Liberal Democrats	John Turner	133	4.3	0
Majority		203	6.5	
Turnout			28.9	
Labour hold		Swing	▼1.0	

Sunbury Common and Ashford Common
Party	Candidate	Votes	%	±%
Conservative	Alison Griffiths	1,509	46.6	+3
Liberal Democrats	Bernie Spoor	610	18.8	−14
Labour	Khalid Mustafa	522	16.1	+3
Green	Jan Doerfel	274	8.5	+5
Independent	Lesley Connor	175	5.4	+5
Reform	Rory O'Brien	147	4.5	+5
Majority		899	27.8	
Turnout			27.8	
Conservative hold		Swing	▲6.5	

=== Surrey Heath ===
Surrey Heath district summary
Party	Seats	+/-	Votes	%	+/-
Conservative	6	Steady	12,039	49.0	–9.6
Liberal Democrats	0	Steady	7,881	32.1	+16.3
Labour	0	Steady	2,166	8.8	–0.1
Independent	0	Steady	1,690	6.9	–1.7
Green	0	Steady	386	1.6	–3.0
Reform UK	0	Steady	211	0.9	N/A
UKIP	0	Steady	102	0.4	–2.9
Workers Party	0	Steady	86	0.3	N/A
TUSC	0	Steady	20	0.1	N/A
Total	6	Steady	24,581		

Division results

Bagshot, Windlesham and Chobham
Party	Candidate	Votes	%	±%
Conservative	Richard Tear	1,633	36.5	−26
Independent	Victoria Wheeler	1,326	29.6	+30
Liberal Democrats	Richard Wilson	1,087	24.3	+7
Labour Co-op	Jonathan Quin	298	6.7	+1
Reform	Samantha Goggin	130	2.9	+3
Majority		307	6.9	−38
Rejected ballots		56		
Turnout		4,502	40.2	+4
Conservative hold		Swing	▼28.0	

Camberley East
Party	Candidate	Votes	%	±%
Conservative	Trefor Hogg	2,015	56.9	−14
Liberal Democrats	Sashi Mylvaganam	959	27.1	+11
Labour Co-op	Rodney Bates	568	16.0	+3
Majority		1,056	29.8	−26
Rejected ballots		70		
Turnout		3,577	32.1	+3
Conservative hold		Swing	▼12.5	

Camberley West
Party	Candidate	Votes	%	±%
Conservative	David Lewis	1,860	49.2	−2
Liberal Democrats	Alan Ashbery	1,243	32.9	+24
Labour	Murray Rowlands	593	15.7	−1
Workers Party	Venura Ilangamudalige	86	2.3	+2
Majority		617	16.3	−35
Rejected ballots		72		
Turnout		3,818	31.8	+1
Conservative hold		Swing	▼13.0	

Frimley Green and Mytchett
Party	Candidate	Votes	%	±%
Conservative	Paul Deach	2,520	61.7	+1
Liberal Democrats	Jacques Olmo	1,276	31.2	+12
Labour	Christine Richards	291	7.1	−1
Majority		1,244	30.4	
Rejected ballots		38		
Turnout		4,106	38.4	
Conservative hold		Swing	▼11.0	

Heatherside and Parkside
Party	Candidate	Votes	%	±%
Conservative	Edward Hawkins	2,073	48.6	−5
Liberal Democrats	Nirmal Kang	1,900	44.5	+28
Labour	Mick Sheehan	194	4.5	−1
UKIP	Hazel Prowse	102	2.4	−3
Majority		173	4.1	
Rejected ballots		44		
Turnout		4,291	40.9	
Conservative hold		Swing	▼16.5	

Lightwater, West End and Bisley
Party	Candidate	Votes	%	±%
Conservative	Rebecca Jennings-Evans	1,938	43.8	−11
Liberal Democrats	Liz Noble	1,416	32.0	+16
Green	Sharon Galliford	386	8.7	+5
Independent	Graham Alleway	364	8.2	−8
Labour	Richard Claridge	222	5.0	−1
Reform	Peter Appleford	81	1.8	+2
TUSC	Katherine Parker	20	0.5	+0
Majority		522	11.8	
Rejected ballots		54		
Turnout		4,454	36.3	
Conservative hold		Swing	▼13.5	

=== Tandridge ===
Tandridge district summary
Party	Seats	+/-	Votes	%	+/-
Conservative	4	Steady	12,324	46.3	–5.4
Liberal Democrats	1	▼1	6,219	23.3	–4.5
Independent	1	▲1	4,552	17.1	N/A
Labour	0	Steady	2,600	9.8	+1.7
Green	0	Steady	843	3.2	+1.7
UKIP	0	Steady	105	0.4	–10.4
Total	6	Steady	26,643		

Division results

Caterham Hill
Party	Candidate	Votes	%	±%
Conservative	Jeremy Webster	1,913	43.6	0
Liberal Democrats	Chris Botten	1,819	41.5	−3
Labour	Robin Clements	434	9.9	+3
Independent	Helena Windsor	218	5.0	+5
Majority		94	2.1	
Turnout			38.8	
Conservative gain from Liberal Democrats		Swing	▲1.5	

Caterham Valley
Party	Candidate	Votes	%	±%
Liberal Democrats	Jeffrey Gray	1,751	47.5	0
Conservative	Michael Cooper	1,348	36.6	−3
Labour	Caz Lessey	388	10.5	+4
	Jeffrey Bolter	201	5.5	+5
Majority		403	10.9	
Turnout			38.0	
Liberal Democrats hold		Swing	▲1.5	

Godstone
Party	Candidate	Votes	%	±%
Independent	Chris Farr	1,522	39.2	+39
Conservative	Eithne Webster	1,312	33.8	−13
Liberal Democrats	Martin Redman	412	10.6	−7
Green	Sarah Finch	382	9.8	+10
Labour	Linda Baharier	252	6.5	−2
Majority		210	5.4	
Turnout			40.2	
Independent gain from Conservative		Swing	▲26.0	

Lingfield
Party	Candidate	Votes	%	±%
Conservative	Lesley Steeds	2,352	49.2	−20
Independent	Liz Lockwood	1,168	24.4	+24
Green	Becky Peterson	461	9.6	+10
Liberal Democrats	Dave Wilkes	382	8.0	−7
Labour	Andrea Moss	315	6.6	0
UKIP	Julia Searle	105	2.2	−7
Majority		1,184	24.8	
Turnout			38.3	
Conservative hold		Swing	▼22.0	

Oxted
Party	Candidate	Votes	%	±%
Conservative	Cameron McIntosh	2,907	51.7	+2
Independent	Christopher Dean	1,106	19.7	+10
Labour	Samuel Kerr	976	17.3	+3
Liberal Democrats	Perry Chotai	638	11.3	−7
Majority		1,801	32.0	
Turnout			46.6	
Conservative hold		Swing	▼4.0	

Warlingham
Party	Candidate	Votes	%	±%
Conservative	Becky Rush	2,492	58.2	+2
Liberal Democrats	Celia Caulcott	1,217	28.4	−1
Independent	Martin Haley	337	7.9	+8
Labour	Nathan Manning	235	5.5	0
Majority		1,275	29.8	
Turnout			41.2	
Conservative hold		Swing	▲1.5	

=== Waverley ===
Waverley district summary
Party	Seats	+/-	Votes	%	+/-
Liberal Democrats	4	▲3	12,079	30.2	+5.7
Farnham Residents	3	▲1	6,548	16.4	+2.2
Conservative	2	▼4	15,717	39.2	–10.2
Labour	0	Steady	3,284	8.2	+3.9
Green	0	Steady	1,709	4.3	+0.2
Independent	0	Steady	492	1.2	+0.8
UKIP	0	Steady	136	0.3	–2.8
Reform UK	0	Steady	80	0.2	N/A
Total	9	Steady	40,045		

Division results

Cranleigh and Ewhurst
Party	Candidate	Votes	%	±%
Liberal Democrats	Liz Townsend	2,318	46.5	+19
Conservative	Andrew Povey	2,198	44.1	−10
Labour	Callum Gordon	330	6.6	−2
UKIP	Dennis McLaren	136	2.7	−6
Majority		120	2.4	
Turnout			44.3	
Liberal Democrats gain from Conservative		Swing	▲14.5	

Farnham Central
Party	Candidate	Votes	%	±%
Farnham Residents	Andy MacLeod	2,782	67.3	+24
Conservative	Aly Fitch	929	22.5	−4
Labour	John Gaskell	420	10.2	+10
Majority		1,853	44.9	
Turnout			39.3	
Farnham Residents hold		Swing	▲14.0	

Farnham North
Party	Candidate	Votes	%	±%
Farnham Residents	Catherine Powell	2,107	55.8	+11
Conservative	Nabeel Nasir	719	19.0	−17
Liberal Democrats	Mark Merryweather	589	15.6	+4
Labour	Howard Kaye	361	9.6	+10
Majority		1,388	36.8	
Turnout			37.5	
Farnham Residents hold		Swing	▲14.0	

Farnham South
Party	Candidate	Votes	%	±%
Farnham Residents	Michaela Martin	1,659	40.5	+3
Conservative	Simon Foale	1,497	36.5	−2
Independent	Mark Westcott	492	12.0	+8
Labour	Rebecca Birchwood	449	11.0	+7
Majority		162	4.0	
Turnout			40.3	
Farnham Residents gain from Conservative		Swing	▲2.5	

Godalming North
Party	Candidate	Votes	%	±%
Liberal Democrats	Penny Rivers	3,047	59.6	+14
Conservative	Frank Young	1,530	29.9	−10
Labour	Toby Westcott-White	534	10.4	+10
Majority		1,517	29.7	
Turnout			43.9	
Liberal Democrats hold		Swing	▲12.0	

Godalming South, Milford and Witley
Party	Candidate	Votes	%	±%
Liberal Democrats	Paul Follows	3,044	58.8	+35
Conservative	Kirsty Walden	1,886	36.5	−26
Labour	Zahida Zahoor	244	4.7	−9
Majority		1,158	22.4	
Turnout			48.2	
Liberal Democrats gain from Conservative		Swing	▲30.5	

Haslemere
Party	Candidate	Votes	%	±%
Liberal Democrats	John Robini	2,038	50.0	+22
Conservative	Ged Hall	1,751	43.0	−10
Labour	David Irwin	287	7.0	+1
Majority		287	7.0	
Turnout			42.0	
Liberal Democrats gain from Conservative		Swing	▲16.0	

Waverley Eastern Villages
Party	Candidate	Votes	%	±%
Conservative	Kevin Deanus	2,793	61.8	−6
Green	Stephen Williams	1,287	28.5	+28
Labour	Peter Hopwood	443	9.8	+3
Majority		1,506	33.3	
Turnout			41.7	
Conservative hold		Swing	▼17.0	

Waverley Western Villages
Party	Candidate	Votes	%	±%
Conservative	Peter Harmer	2,414	57.8	−13
Liberal Democrats	Julian Spence	1,043	25.0	+7
Green	Fi Scimone	422	10.1	−1
Labour	Andrew Jones	216	5.2	+5
Reform	Richard Williams	80	1.9	+2
Majority		1,371	32.8	
Turnout			43.3	
Conservative hold		Swing	▼10,0	

=== Woking ===
Woking district summary
Party	Seats	+/-	Votes	%	+/-
Conservative	4	▼2	12,564	41.3	–7.0
Liberal Democrats	2	▲1	9,151	30.1	+1.0
Independent	1	▲1	3,010	9.9	+5.5
Labour	0	Steady	3,516	11.6	–1.8
Green	0	Steady	1,394	4.6	N/A
Heritage	0	Steady	541	1.8	N/A
UKIP	0	Steady	203	0.7	–4.1
TUSC	0	Steady	37	0.1	N/A
Total	7	Steady	30,416		

Division results

Goldsworth East and Horsell Village
Party	Candidate	Votes	%	±%
Liberal Democrats	Lance Spencer	2,252	46.7	+5
Conservative	Colin Kemp	2,056	42.7	0
Labour	Michael Kelly	510	10.6	+1
Majority		196	4.1	N/A
Turnout		4,866	44.1	+3
Liberal Democrats gain from Conservative		Swing	▲2.5	

Knaphill and Goldsworth West
Party	Candidate	Votes	%	±%
Conservative	Saj Hussain	2,101	47.0	−16
Independent	Hassan Akberali	988	22.1	+22
Liberal Democrats	Ann-Marie Barker	935	20.9	−1
Labour	Gerry Mitchell	363	8.1	−2
Heritage	Damien Heads	50	1.1	+1
TUSC	Juniper Holmes	37	0.8	+1
Majority		1,113	24.9	−16
Turnout		4,499	39.4	+5
Conservative hold		Swing	▼19.0	

The Byfleets
Party	Candidate	Votes	%	±%
Independent	Amanda Boote	2,022	54.2	+22
Conservative	Stewart Dick	1,111	29.8	−11
Liberal Democrats	Peter Graves	350	9.4	−9
Green	Jim Craig	247	6.6	+7
Majority		911	24.4	N/A
Turnout		3,752	36.0	−1
Independent gain from Conservative		Swing	▲16.5	

Woking North
Party	Candidate	Votes	%	±%
Conservative	Mohammad Riasat Khan	2,119	47.8	+4
Labour	Mohammad Ali	1,973	44.5	+6
UKIP	Will Roe	203	4.6	+1
Heritage	Gian Palermiti	136	3.1	+3
Majority		146	3.3	−2
Turnout		4,503	42.0	+1
Conservative hold		Swing	▼1.0	

Woking South
Party	Candidate	Votes	%	±%
Liberal Democrats	Will Forster	2,747	58.0	+4
Conservative	Philip Gent	1,210	25.5	−8
Labour	Sabir Hussain	360	7.6	0
Green	Kate Kett	327	6.9	+7
Heritage	Michael Heaton	94	2.0	+2
Majority		1,537	32.4	+12
Turnout		4,759	39.1	+1
Liberal Democrats hold		Swing	▲6.0	

Woking South East
Party	Candidate	Votes	%	±%
Conservative	Liz Bowes	2,246	50.5	−11
Liberal Democrats	Ellen Nicholson	1,607	36.1	+11
Green	Christine Murphy	475	10.7	+11
Heritage	Judith Squire	119	2.7	+3
Majority		639	14.4	−23
Turnout		4,474	42.8	+5
Conservative hold		Swing	▼11.0	

Woking South West
Party	Candidate	Votes	%	±%
Conservative	Ayesha Azad	1,721	45.6	−9
Liberal Democrats	Dale Roberts	1,260	33.4	+5
Green	Ella Walding	345	9.1	+9
Labour	Sharaz Hussain	310	8.2	−3
Heritage	Tim Read	142	3.8	+4
Majority		461	12.2	−13
Turnout		3,799	40.0	+4
Conservative hold		Swing	▼7.0	

== Changes 2021–2027 ==
- In November 2022, Andy Lynch, who had been elected as a Conservative, had the Conservative whip withdrawn and sat as an independent.
- In July 2025, Lynch left the Conservatives and joined Reform UK.

=== Sunbury Common and Ashford Common ===
Sunbury Common and Ashford Common by-election, 30 November 2022
Party	Candidate	Votes	%	±%
Liberal Democrats	Harry Boparai	735	35.9	+17.1
Conservative	Naz Islam	720	35.2	−11.4
Labour	Khalid Mustafa	383	18.7	+2.6
Reform	Rory O'Brien	144	7.0	+2.5
TUSC	Helen Couchman	63	3.1	N/A
Majority		15	0.7	
Turnout		2,045	17.5	
Liberal Democrats gain from Conservative		Swing	▲14.3	

The by-election was triggered by the death of Conservative councillor Alison Todd, who had been elected under her former name, Alison Griffiths.

=== Walton South and Oatlands ===
Walton South and Oatlands by-election, 4 May 2023
Party	Candidate	Votes	%	±%
Liberal Democrats	Ashley Tilling	2,162	44.1	+7.5
Conservative	Hilary Butler	2,077	42.4	−11.2
Labour	Warren Weertman	311	6.3	−3.4
Green	Steven Ringham	235	4.8	N/A
UKIP	Nicholas Wood	114	2.3	N/A
Majority		85	1.7	
Rejected ballots		26		
Turnout		4,925	43.2	+2.2
Liberal Democrats gain from Conservative		Swing	▲9.3	

The by-election followed the resignation of Conservative councillor Tony Samuels.

=== Horsleys ===
Horsleys by-election, 19 October 2023
Party	Candidate	Votes	%	±%
R4GV	Dennis Booth	1,095	39.3	−8.5
Liberal Democrats	Paul Kennedy	1,023	36.7	+25.1
Conservative	Alexander Stewart-Clark	569	20.4	−17.0
Labour	John Barnes	99	3.5	+0.3
Majority		72	2.6	−7.8
Rejected ballots		4		
Turnout		2,790	28.3	−18.5
R4GV hold		Swing	▼16.8	

The by-election followed the resignation of Residents for Guildford and Villages councillor Colin Cross.

=== Nork and Tattenhams ===
Nork and Tattenhams by-election, 1 May 2025
Party	Candidate	Votes	%	±%
Nork and Tattenhams Residents' Associations	Peter Harp	2,084	53.9	-9.9
Reform	Elizabeth Cooper	902	23.3	+23.3
Conservative	Pamela Freeman	515	13.3	−7.7
Labour	Esme Wright	167	4.3	−2.7
Liberal Democrats	Mike Robinson	106	2.7	−1.0
Green	Alistair Morten	93	2.4	−2.1
Majority		1,182	30.6	−12.2
Turnout		3,869	31.8	
Rejected ballots		2		
Nork and Tattenhams Residents' Associations hold		Swing		

The by-election followed the decision of Nork and Tattenhams Residents' Associations councillor Nick Harrison to stand down.

=== Woking South ===
Woking South by-election, 10 July 2025
Party	Candidate	Votes	%	±%
Liberal Democrats	Louise Morales	1,939	63.8	+5.8
Reform	Richard Barker	584	19.2	N/A
Conservative	Martin Benstead	291	9.6	−16.4
Green	Paul Hoekstra	134	4.4	−2.6
Labour	Sean O'Malley	91	3.0	−5
Majority		1,355	44.6	+12.6
Rejected ballots		9		
Turnout		3,048	25.1	−14
Registered electors		12,139		
Liberal Democrats hold		Swing	+11.1	

The by-election followed the resignation of Liberal Democrat councillor Will Forster, who had been elected as the Member of Parliament for Woking at the 2024 United Kingdom general election.

=== Addlestone ===
Addlestone by-election, 21 August 2025
Party	Candidate	Votes	%	±%
Reform	Scott Kelly	931	34.2	N/A
Conservative	Shannon Saise-Marshall	659	24.2	−25.9
Liberal Democrats	Michael Smith	473	17.4	+9.3
Green	Steven Ringham	441	16.2	+2.0
Labour Co-op	Arran Neathey	222	8.1	−10.9
Majority		272	10.0	
Turnout		2,734	24.1	−6.9
Rejected ballots		8		
Registered electors		11,360		
Reform gain from Conservative				

The by-election was triggered by the death of Conservative councillor John Furey.

=== Hinchley Wood, Claygate & Oxshott ===
Hinchley Wood, Claygate & Oxshott by-election, 21 August 2025
Party	Candidate	Votes	%	±%
Liberal Democrats	Andy Burton	1,656	38.1	−6.2
Conservative	Andrew Burley	1,346	31.0	−15.9
Independent	Mary Marshall	659	15.2	N/A
Reform	Nicholas Wood	551	12.7	+8.3
Green	Sarah Coomes	101	2.3	N/A
Labour	Irene Threlkeld	31	0.7	−3.6
Majority		310	7.1	
Turnout		4,349	34.0	−13.0
Rejected ballots		2		
Registered electors		12,796		
Liberal Democrats gain from Conservative		Swing	▲4.9	

The by-election was triggered by the death of Conservative councillor Mark Sugden.

=== Camberley West ===
Camberley West by-election, 16 October 2025
Party	Candidate	Votes	%	±%
Liberal Democrats	Alan Ashbery	1,617	49.5	+16.6
Reform	Darryl Ratiram	845	25.9	N/A
Conservative	Attieh Fard	666	20.4	−28.8
Labour	Simon Schofield	140	4.3	−11.4
Majority		772	23.6	
Rejected ballots		15		
Turnout		3,283	27.3	−4.7
Registered electors		12,034		
Liberal Democrats gain from Conservative		Swing	+22.7	

The by-election was triggered by the death of Conservative councillor David Lewis.

=== Caterham Valley ===
Caterham Valley by-election, 16 October 2025
Party	Candidate	Votes	%	±%
Liberal Democrats	Tony Pearce	1,182	48.1	+0.6
Reform	Jacqueline Thomson	601	24.5	N/A
Conservative	Richard Mark	320	13.0	−23.5
Green	Leo Domingues	135	5.5	N/A
Caterham Residents	Peter Roberts	131	5.3	N/A
Labour	Jon Wheale	89	3.6	−6.9
Majority		581	23.6	+12.7
Rejected ballots		5		
Turnout		2,463	25.1	
Registered electors		9,803		
Liberal Democrats hold				

The by-election followed the resignation of Liberal Democrat councillor Jeffrey Gray.

=== Guildford South East ===
Guildford South East by-election, 16 October 2025
Party	Candidate	Votes	%	±%
Liberal Democrats	Catherine Houston	1,426	41.3	+18.0
Conservative	Alex Fiuza	788	22.8	−8.1
R4GV	John Redpath	565	16.3	−21.4
Reform	Dale Layman	416	12.0	N/A
Green	Claire Whitehouse	172	5.0	N/A
Labour	Richard Eggleton	89	2.6	−5.6
Majority		638	18.5	
Rejected ballots		10		
Turnout		3,465	32.9	
Registered electors		10,544		
Liberal Democrats gain from R4GV		Swing	▲19.7	

The by-election followed the resignation of Residents for Guildford and Villages councillor Fiona Davidson for personal reasons.

=== Warlingham ===
Warlingham by-election, 7 May 2026
Party	Candidate	Votes	%	±%
Reform	Jacquie Thomson	1,597	31.8	N/A
Conservative	Robin Kenneth Bloore	1,446	28.8	−29.2
Liberal Democrats	Perry Chotai	1,178	23.4	−4.6
Green	Sarah Jane Stewart	329	6.5	N/A
Independent	Martin Arthur Haley	308	6.1	N/A
Labour	Andrew Gerald Waters	171	3.4	−1.6
Majority		151	3.0	
Turnout		5,070	49.0	
Rejected ballots		41		
Registered electors		10,344		
Reform gain from Conservative		Swing		

The by-election followed the resignation of Conservative councillor Becky Rush.

=== Haslemere ===
Haslemere by-election: 7 July 2026
Party	Candidate	Votes	%	±%
Liberal Democrats	Terry Weldon	1,181	47.5	−2.5
Conservative	Toby Byfield	797	32.0	−11.0
Green	Thomas Oliver Shrive	280	11.3	N/A
Reform	Barb Witt	230	9.2	N/A
Majority		384	15.4	
Rejected ballots		3	0.1	
Turnout		2,488	24.9	
Registered electors		9,978		
Liberal Democrats hold		Swing	▲4.3	

The by-election was triggered by the death of Liberal Democrat councillor John Robini.
