= Rebecca Paul (politician) =

British politician

Rebecca Paul MP
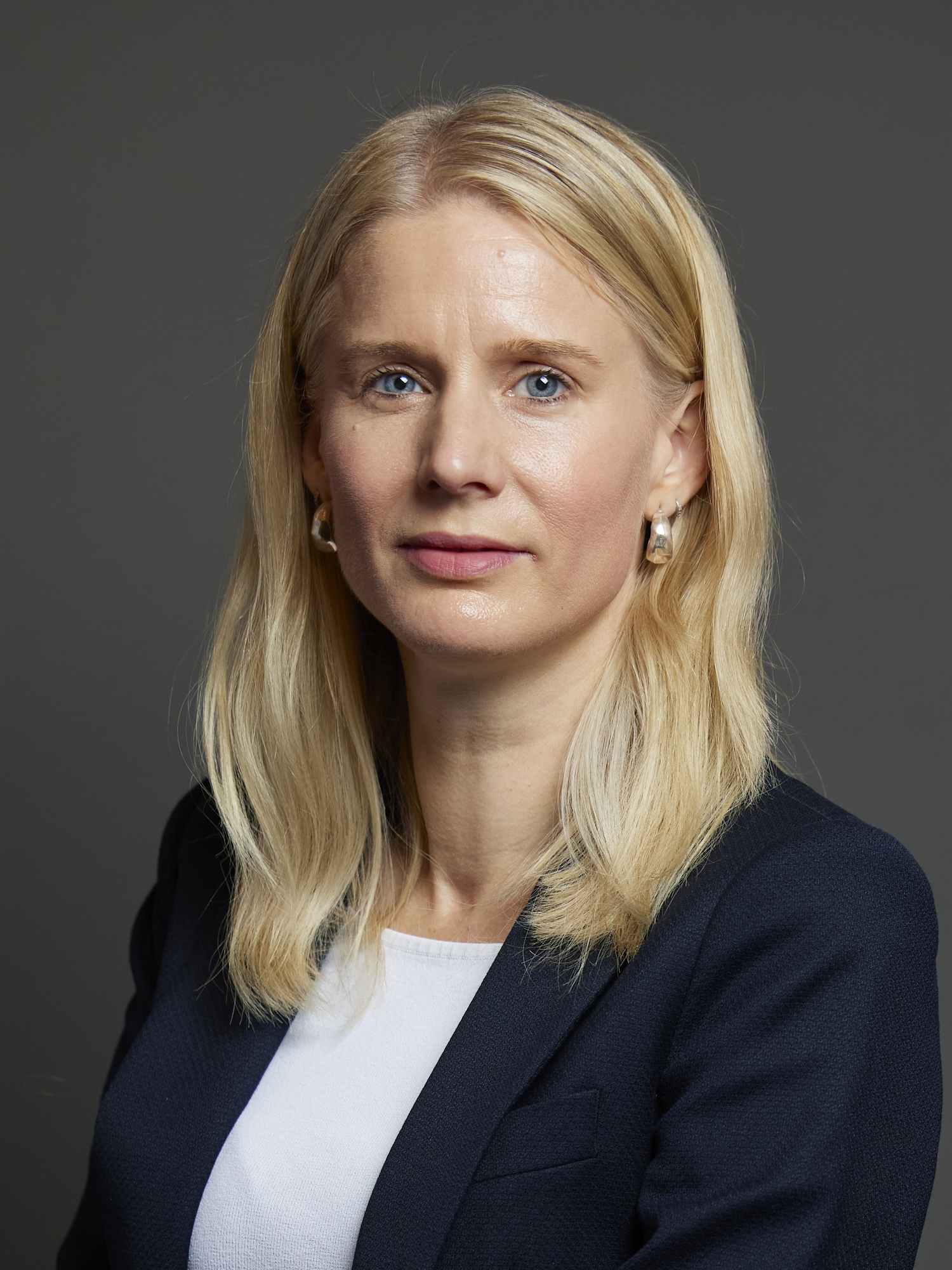
- Official portrait, 2024

Shadow Secretary of State for Digital, Culture, Media and Sport
- Incumbent
- Assumed office 31 August 2026
- Leader: Kemi Badenoch
- Preceded by: Nigel Huddleston

Member of Parliament for Reigate
- Incumbent
- Assumed office 4 July 2024
- Preceded by: Crispin Blunt
- Majority: 3,187 (6.0%)

Councillor, Tadworth, Walton & Kingswood division for Surrey County Council
- Incumbent
- Assumed office 10 May 2021
- Preceded by: Jeffrey Harris
- Majority: 2,425 (59.0%)

Personal details
- Born: 1979 (age 46–47)
- Party: Conservative

Rebecca Sheila Paul (born 1979) is a British politician who has served as Shadow Secretary of State for Digital, Culture, Media and Sport since 2026. A member of the Conservative Party, she has been the Member of Parliament (MP) for Reigate since 2024 and a Surrey County Councillor for Tadworth, Walton & Kingswood since 2021.

== Biography ==
=== Early career ===
Rebecca Paul has worked in tax management for businesses and charities, including working as a consultant for EY and director of tax at Diageo. She worked in Parliament for Robin Millar, MP for Aberconwy, from 2019 to 2024.

=== Political career ===
Paul was elected as the councillor for Tadworth, Walton and Kingswood at the 2021 Surrey County Council election with 70 per cent of the vote share. She served as the Deputy Cabinet Member for Levelling Up on Surrey County Council from 2021 to 2023.

In July 2023, Paul was selected as the Conservative prospective parliamentary candidate for Reigate. The incumbent MP, Crispin Blunt, was elected as a Conservative but had the whip removed and did not stand again.

=== Member of Parliament ===
==== 2024 ====
At the 2024 general election, she won the seat with 35 per cent of the vote share and a majority of 3,187. She said that she was "really concerned that there will be a rush of parents applying for an Education, Health and Care Plan which will put significant pressure on the local authorities" as a result of government plans to put VAT on independent school fees. At Prime Minister's Questions, in September 2024, she asked if Keir Starmer would consider broadening Winter Fuel Payment eligibility for lower income pensioners. She and five other MPs argued in an open letter to the chancellor Rachel Reeves in September 2024 that families of children with special educational needs (SEND) should be exempt from government plans to put VAT on independent school fees. She was appointed as Opposition Assistant Whip on 18 November 2024. She expressed support in December 2024 for the construction of a new fire station in Banstead.

==== Terminally Ill Adults (End of Life) Bill ====
Paul voted against the Terminally Ill Adults (End of Life) Bill and served on the committee examining the legislation. She said that she opposed the bill as she believed that the healthcare system was too stretched to ensure protection for vulnerable people. Paul supported Juliet Campbell's amendment to the bill which would have required the next of kin to be informed if an adult under the age of 25 had their application for an assisted death approved. In response to comments made by Dame Esther Rantzen, who suggested that opponents of the bill have "undeclared personal religious beliefs which mean no precautions would satisfy them", Paul declared that, whilst she opposed the bill, she was not against assisted dying "in principle" and that she had "no personal religious beliefs". She put forward an amendment to the bill which would have prevented employees from providing assisted dying while working for an employer that had chosen not to take part in the process, but was rejected. Paul also objected to loopholes in the bill which would have allowed people with anorexia, mental health problems, or learning difficulties to become eligible for assisted dying in some circumstances.

==== 2025 ====
Paul raised concerns regarding assaults on officers at HM Prison Downview in March 2025. She spoke in favour of a ban on the advertisement of prostitution online during the second reading of the Crime and Policing Bill in March 2025. She launched a campaign to support pubs in the constituency in April 2025. In a letter to Surrey County Council in May 2025, Paul and six other Conservative MPs criticised the council's decision to not respond to constituent SEND cases. In June 2025, she wrote in favour of the ban on the use of puberty blockers in treatment for gender dysphoria in children. She spoke against Tonia Antoniazzi's amendment to the Crime and Policing Bill to decriminalise women who induce their own abortion in June 2025, warning that "if this becomes law, fully developed babies up to term could be aborted by a woman with no consequences". The All-Party Parliamentary Group for Better Roads was launched by Paul in June 2025. Paul said that special educational needs and disabilities (SEND) support services in Surrey were in "crisis" and children were not getting the support they were entitled to.

She has expressed concern "about the proliferation of adverts targeting young women to donate their eggs" and called on the Government to "conduct a proper study on the long-term health impact of such procedures on women – particularly in the case of women going through multiple rounds". She has said that the "seven males in HMP Downview, a women's prison in Banstead, must be moved without delay". In August 2025, Paul asked Wes Streeting, the Secretary of State for Health and Social Care, to commit to the new emergency area hospital in Sutton and improvements to Epsom Hospital and St Helier Hospital following the announcement by chancellor of the exchequer Rachel Reeves of a review into hospital and road projects.

Paul led a debate in the House of Commons on property service charges in October 2025 and said that local authorities should be obliged "in all but the most exceptional of cases, to adopt communal land and infrastructure on completion of new estates" and "developers would also need to be obliged to ensure the infrastructure meets the council standards before transfer". In November, Paul and 29 other MPs wrote to the Ministry of Housing, Communities and Local Government to demand that a task force be established to combat illegal development in the countryside, often by Irish Travellers.

On 1 December 2025, she replaced James Cleverly on the Education Select Committee. She has said that high property service charges were trapping residents in properties that they could not afford. She demanded that Streeting immediately paused a planned NHS trial of puberty blockers for children in a letter alongside Labour MP Jonathan Hinder, the Conservative MP Tom Tugendhat, the Reform UK MP Sarah Pochin, the independent MPs Rosie Duffield, Rupert Lowe, and Iqbal Mohamed, and the Liberal Democrat peer Sarah Ludford, Baroness Ludford.

==== 2026 ====
In January 2026, she criticised the treatment of patients in corridors at East Surrey Hospital. To tackle abuse and coercion of Muslim women and girls from within Muslim communities, Paul wrote a report calling for a prohibition on headscarves for children in schools up to age 16, compulsory legal registration of Islamic marriages, a prohibition on first cousin marriage, a national task force to increase prosecutions for female genital mutilation, tailored support for Muslim women facing domestic abuse, and a more assertive approach to integration. She also said that "close-knit clannish structures within isolated, unintegrated communities" facilitated honour-based crimes.

She tabled an amendment to the Crime and Policing Bill to ban learner moped drivers from undertaking commercial activity using the roads, but was unsuccessful. She criticised the nationalisation of British Steel, suggesting that the Labour Government was "keen to take us back to the 1970s".

She was appointed as Shadow Secretary of State for Digital, Culture, Media and Sport on 31 August 2026. She called on the Government to ensure that TikTok and other social media platforms removed videos "which glorify dangerous driving and police chases" following the deaths of seven people, including two police officers, in a crash near Middlesbrough in August. She criticised the decision to host a series of nightclub-inspired music events at St Paul's Cathedral in London. She voted against the Terminally Ill Adults (End of Life) Bill at its second reading after it was brought back to the House of Commons. She attacked the overnight visitor levy, arguing that it would likely result in fewer tourists and fewer local hospitality jobs.

Paul, with Nick Timothy MP, criticised Sarah Mullally, Archbishop of Canterbury, for the decision to honour the Pakistani Muslim cleric Tahir Mehmood Ashrafi with an award for reconciliation and interfaith cooperation on the 25th anniversary of the September 11 attacks, despite Ashrafi having previously praised Osama bin Laden.

=== Political views ===
Rebecca Paul has been described as a "traditional conservative whose background led her to value aspiration above all". She has said that "we weren't being Conservative" under David Cameron. She argued that the previous Conservative government "tried to keep everyone happy and ended up with a mishmash of policies". She has described herself as "a big fan" of Kemi Badenoch, who Paul considered to be a "principled politician".

== Electoral history ==
General election 2024: Reigate
Party	Candidate	Votes	%	±%
Conservative	Rebecca Paul	18,822	35.4	−20.4
Labour	Stuart Brady	15,635	29.4	+12.5
Reform	Joseph Fox	7,240	13.6	New
Liberal Democrats	Mark Johnston	6,773	12.7	−7.2
Green	Jonathan Essex	4,691	8.8	+3.0
Majority		3,187	6.0	−28.4
Turnout		53,161	69.0	−1.2
Registered electors		77,101		
Conservative hold		Swing	−16.4	

Parliament of the United Kingdom
Preceded by Crispin Blunt	Member of Parliament for Reigate; 2024–present	Incumbent
