= Tony Richardson (British Army officer) =

British army officer (1922–2015)

Major-General Tony Richardson CB MBE
- Born: 9 August 1922; Egypt
- Died: 26 March 2015 (aged 92)
- Spouse: Katherine Joanna Roberts (m. 1945) Anthea Fry (m. 1991)
- Children: 2
- Relatives: Crispin Blunt (nephew)

Major-General Thomas Anthony Richardson CB MBE (9 August 1922 – 26 March 2015) was a British Army officer who took part in the Normandy landings in June 1944, the liberation of Brussels, and the forced crossing of the Rhine.

== Early life ==
Richardson was born on 9 August 1922 in Egypt to a military family. He was the eldest son of Major-General T W Richardson. He was educated at Wellington College.

== Military career ==
Richardson enlisted into the Essex Yeomanry and served in the Normandy landings, the capture of Lille and the advances on Nijmegen and Arnhem. After the war he studied at the Staff College, Camberley and became an instructor at the Royal Military College of Science. In 1958 he joined the Directorate of Land/Air Warfare in the War Office, working on the introduction of helicopters into the Army Air Corps, for which he was appointed MBE.

In a varied and distinguished career, he served with the Royal Horse Artillery (RHA) in Germany and at the Ministry of Defence as military assistant to the Deputy Chief of the General Staff. He served as Commander Royal Artillery of the 2nd Division in the Army of the Rhine in 1967, and then became Director of Army Aviation in 1971. He later went to New Delhi as Defence Advisor to the British High Commission.

He was appointed CB in 1974 and retired from the army in 1997.

== Personal life ==
Richardson married twice. Firstly, he married Katherine Joanna Roberts in 1945: they had two children. Following her death, he married Anthea Fry, daughter of Professor Dennis Butler Fry in 1991.

Richardson died on 26 March 2015, aged 92.
