= Forum of Private Business =

British trade association for small and medium businesses

- Abbreviation: The FPB
- Nickname: The Forum
- Formation: 1977; 49 years ago
- Founder: Stan Mendham
- Type: Trade association not-for-profit
- Purpose: Provide support and advocacy for small businesses in the United Kingdom
- Location: Knutsford, United Kingdom
- Region served: United Kingdom
- Products: Business support help line, legal and financial advice, training, campaigns, advocacy for small businesses
- Managing Director: Ian Cass
- Funding: Member fees
- Website: www.fpb.org

The Forum of Private Business (The FPB) is a UK-based trade association which campaigns for the interests of small and medium-sized businesses. A member-funded organisation, it offers practical business advice and help, as well as offering a range of products and services to help its members save money. The Forum which was established in 1977, is a non-party political organisation and represents over 25,000 UK businesses.

== History ==
The Forum (the FPB) was founded by Stan Mendham in 1977. Previously, Mendham ran an engineering business but was becoming increasingly concerned by the lack of understanding of smaller businesses in the economy and mounting red tape. He studied member-based organisations for smaller businesses in America and Canada, and decided to create a British equivalent.

Mendham wanted the FPB to always represent accurately the views of its members. To do so, he introduced a campaign strategy based on information collected through regular surveys. The FPB refers to them as referendums, and they are completed every three months.

The company is based at Ashley Hall, part of the privately owned Tatton Estate, between Knutsford Cheshire and Altrincham in Greater Manchester, but works with businesses across the UK.

== Services and products ==
=== Website ===
The Forum's website offers a variety of services, some free, and some requiring paid membership. Daily updated business news is available on the main site. "Hot tips" articles are brief informative articles designed to help businesses, and do not include either press releases or advertisements. A variety of useful tools and calculators for daily business operations are also available.

=== Other services ===
The FPB offers a range of up to date business guides to help businesses including a credit control guide, an employment guide, and a health and safety guide. The FPB also offers both free and paid business templates that cover a variety of business forms, procedures, and documentation that may be of use for private businesses.

== Charity work ==
The FPB supports the Children's Cancer and Leukaemia Group (CCLG) as its chosen charity. FPB employees are committed to generating funds that support the group's work, as well as increasing the nation's awareness of the charity and its activities. This includes improving the management of children with cancer and advancing knowledge and research on childhood malignancies.

FPB employees have previously raised several thousands of pounds for the charity by taking part in the Wilmslow Half-Marathon, hiking to the summit of Snowdon in North Wales and taking part in the three peaks challenge.

Most recently, eight female staff members raised over £1,500 by taking part in a sponsored walk with a difference along the Wirral Way, Merseyside, in a three-legged relay.

== Timeline of notable events ==
- 1977: The Forum of Private Business is founded. The basic philosophy of "the safeguard of individual choice, the encouragement of free competitive enterprise and a sense of social obligation" is set into action. The FPB gives members the vote through the first Referendum ballot.
- 1982: Due in large part to the FPB's referendum responses, the Government adopts FPB's proposals surrounding sick pay.
- 1985: The Government's White Paper 'Burdens in Business' covers no eight important topics raised by the FPB.
- 1987: The FPB's lobbying results in the Department of Employment launching a simplified statement of main terms and conditions of employment (‘contract of employment'), saving private businesses time and money.
- 1988: Concerted pressure from the FPB wins an agreement to a maximum annual increase in rates for all businesses, with smaller firms paying 5% less than big businesses, and an extension to a five-year phasing-in process, as necessary.
- 1991: Evidence from the FPB sparks a government enquiry into banks' relationships with smaller businesses.
- 1993: A survey of the FPB's members into crime reveals that nearly half of the 2,670 respondents had been affected by crime in the last 12 months. The FPB meets police chiefs and secures widespread coverage to highlight this important issue.
- 1994: Breakthrough on Statutory Sick Pay (SSP). Proposed changes to the SSP system could have resulted in suffering by smaller firms. The FPB steps into action and single-handedly persuades the Government to give more financial protection to those firms that suffer from abnormal sickness.
- 1996: As a result of FPB-led research, the Government agrees to review the Uniform Business Rate (UBR) to reduce its impact on smaller firms.
- 1998: After 15 years of the FPB campaigning for an effective redress against late payers, the Government introduces a statutory right to interest (SRI), with the Late Payment of Commercial Debts (Interest) Act.
- 2000: An investigation by the Government (led by Don Cruickshank) castigates banks for overcharging. Having considered the FPB's research and having visited members of the FPB, Mr Cruickshank heeds their views and tells the Chancellor that the banks overcharged smaller businesses by £0.5billion.
- 2004: Due in part to lobbying efforts of the FPB, the government does not accept attempts by the European Commission to introduce wholesale amendments to the Working Time Directive.
- 2006: The FPB holds its first national Small Firms Summit. The one-day conference, sponsored by Barclays Bank, and with MP David Cameron as keynote speaker, brings together owner-managers and directors of smaller companies.
- 2007: The FPB successfully stops the Government's plan to scrap small firms' Statutory Sick Pay relief.
