= List of settlements in Surrey by population =

The 20 largest settlements of the county of Surrey, with district administrative centres in yellow

This is a list of settlements in Surrey by population based on the results of the 2021 census. The next United Kingdom census will take place in 2031. In 2021, there were 38 built-up area subdivisions with 10,000 or more inhabitants in Surrey, shown in the table below.

== Administrative boundaries ==

District		Centre of administration	Other areas within the borough
1	Spelthorne	Staines-upon-Thames	Ashford, Charlton, Laleham, Littleton, Shepperton, Stanwell, Stanwell Moor, Sunbury on Thames, Upper Halliford
2	Runnymede	Addlestone	Chertsey, Egham, Egham Hythe, Englefield Green, Thorpe, Virginia Water
3	Surrey Heath	Camberley	Bagshot, Bisley, Chobham (includes Castle Green and Mimbridge), Deepcut, Frimley, Frimley Green, Lightwater, Mytchett. Valley End, West End, Windlesham
4	Woking	Woking	Brookwood, Byfleet, Knaphill, Mayford, West Byfleet
5	Elmbridge	Esher	Claygate, Cobham (including Fairmile and the hamlets of Hatchford and Downside), Hersham (including Burwood Park), Hinchley Wood, Long Ditton, Molesey, Oxshott, Stoke D'Abernon, Thames Ditton, Walton on Thames (including Fieldcommon and Ashley Park), West End, Weston Green, Weybridge including St George's Hill
6	Guildford	Guildford	Albury, Artington, Ash, Ash Vale, Compton, East Clandon, East Horsley, Effingham, Normandy, Ockham, Pirbright, Puttenham, Ripley, Seale and Sands, Send, Shackleford, Shalford, Shere, St Martha, Tongham, Wanborough, West Clandon, West Horsley, Wisley, Worplesdon
7	Waverley	Godalming	Alfold, Bramley, Busbridge, Chiddingfold, Churt, Cranleigh, Dockenfield, Dunsfold, Elstead, Ewhurst, Farnham, Frensham, Hambledon, Hascombe, Haslemere, Peper Harow, Thursley, Tilford, Witley, Wonersh
8	Mole Valley	Dorking	Abinger, Ashtead, Capel, Betchworth, Brockham, Buckland, Charlwood, Fetcham, Great Bookham, Headley, Holmwood - (includes Chart Downs, Goodwyns), Leigh, Little Bookham, Mickleham, Newdigate, Ockley, Ranmore, Westcott, Westhumble, Wotton
9	Epsom and Ewell	Epsom	Ewell, North Looe, Stoneleigh (part) (excludes the north of the suburb), Walton Downs, Worcester Park (part) (Cuddington ward)
10	Reigate and Banstead	Reigate	Banstead, Burgh Heath, Chipstead, Earlswood, Epsom Downs (part of), Gatton, Hooley, Horley, Kingswood, Margery, Meadvale, Merstham, Mogador, Netherne-on-the-Hill, Nork, Redhill, Salfords, Sidlow, South Park, Tadworth, The Tattenhams (Tattenham Grove, Heath & Corner), Walton-on-the-Hill, Whitebushes/South Earlswood, Woodhatch, Woodmansterne Park
11	Tandridge	Oxted	Bletchingley, Burstow, Caterham, Chaldon, Chelsham, Crowhurst, Dormansland, Farleigh, Felbridge, Godstone, Horne, Limpsfield, Lingfield, Outwood, Nutfield, Tandridge, Tatsfield, Titsey, Warlingham, Whyteleafe, Woldingham

== Population ranking 2021 ==
#	Settlement	Population	Outlying areas in detail
#	Settlement	2021	Outlying areas in detail
1	Guildford	77,880	
2	Woking	75,660	
3	Staines-upon-Thames	64,746	
4	Walton-on-Thames	40,020	
5	Camberley	39,785	
6	Ewell	37,515	
7	Epsom	35,850	
9	Redhill	30,525	
9	Caterham	28,750	
10	Egham	28,000	Includes Englefield Green & Egham Hythe
11	Tadworth & Epsom Downs	27,095	Includes Nork
12	Horley	29,070	
13	Esher	25,285	Includes Tongham & Mytchett
14	Reigate	23,780	
15	Ashford	22,825	
16	Great Bookham & Fetcham	21,665	Includes Effingham
17	Sunbury-on-Thames	21,475	
18	Farnham	20,500	
19	Cobham	17,505	Includes Oxshott
21	Dorking	17,465	
22	Weybridge	15,915	
23	Stoneleigh	15,850	
24	Frimley	15,100	
25	Ashtead	14,830	
26	Chertsey	14,560	
27	Byfleet	14,190	Includes St. George's Hill
28	Addlestone	13,745	
29	Farncombe	13,250	
30	Hersham	12,625	
31	Haslemere	11,900	
32	Stanwell	11,720	
33	Oxted	11,490	
34	Leatherhead	11,485	
35	Weybourne	11,240	
36	Godalming	10,450	
37	Cranleigh	10,425	

== Population ranking 2001/2011 ==
#	Settlement	Population		Outlying areas in detail
#	Settlement	2001	2011	Outlying areas in detail
1	Woking	96,420	105,367	
2	Guildford	70,000	77,057	
3	Walton-on-Thames	62,540	66,566	
4	Ewell	49,180	51,727	
5	Esher	47,340	50,904	
6	Camberley	34,340	38,038	
7	Redhill	29,590	34,498	
8	Leatherhead	30,150	32,522	
9	Epsom	26,260	31,474	
10	Weybridge	26,863	29,837	
11	Ashford	26,320	28,036	
12	Egham	25,920	25,996	
13	Staines	24,730	25,736	
14	Farnham	23,602	25,604	
15	Horley	21,730	22,693	
16	Godalming	21,840	22,689	
17	Reigate	20,826	22,123	
18	Caterham	19,870	21,437	
19	Frimley	18,766	19,094	
20	Cobham	16,360	17,273	
21	Dorking	16,071	17,098	
22	Addlestone	15,025	15,883	
23	Ashtead	13,210	13,901	
24	Chertsey	12,220	13,753	
25	Oxted	13,010	13,452	
26	Haslemere	12,055	13,122	
27	Banstead	10,120	10,653	
28	Cranleigh	9,670	9,905	
29	Warlingham	8,979	9,092	
30	Lightwater	6,691	6,791	
31	Hindhead	6,120	6,668	Includes Grayshott from Hampshire
32	Witley	6,084	6,437	
33	Virginia Water	5,895	5,940	Ward count
34	East Horsley	5,661	5,866	
35	Bagshot	5,247	5,430	
36	West Clandon/Send	5,232	5,422	
37	Whitebushes/South Earlswood	4,435	4,450	

== See also ==
- Surrey
