= Aberdour School =

Prep school in Burgh Heath, England

Coordinates: 51.311°N 0.215°W

Location
- Brighton Road; Burgh Heath, Surrey, KT20 6AJ; England

Information
- Type: Prep School
- Motto: "Floret Qui Laborat"
- Established: 1928
- Local authority: Surrey
- Department for Education URN: 125317 Tables
- Ofsted: Reports
- Head teacher: Phillip Makhouli
- Gender: Mixed
- Age: 2 to 11
- Enrolment: 330 (Approx.)
- Colour
- Website: aberdourschool.co.uk

Aberdour School, founded in 1928, is a co-educational preparatory school for ages 2–11 in Burgh Heath (near Banstead), Surrey, England. It is a nursery department, pre-preparatory school and preparatory school, and covers 14 acres (57,000 m^{2}), 10 of which are playing fields.

== History ==
Aberdour was founded in 1928 by R.M.D Grange as a boys' boarding school. In 1971 Aberdour School became an educational charitable trust and is now administered by a board of governors. In 1994 it became a co-educational school and its first intake of girls was welcomed with the newly opened nursery.

== Awards ==
- 2010, Royal Society of Chemistry's Bill Bryson Science Prize.
- 2010, TES Independent School Awards, Head of the Year - Winner
- 2013, TES Independent School Awards, Outstanding Financial/Commercial Initiative - Winner

== Headmasters ==
- R.M.D. Grange (1933–1981)
- Alan Barraclough (1981–2002)
- Dr Gerard Silverlock (2002–2006)
- Simon Collins (2006–2025)
- Phillip Makhouli (April 2025 – present)

== Notable pupils ==
- Simon Thomas, television presenter
- Jeremy Vine, television journalist and presenter
- Tim Vine, comedian
