= Tadworth =

Village in Surrey, England

Coordinates: 51.294°N 0.242°W

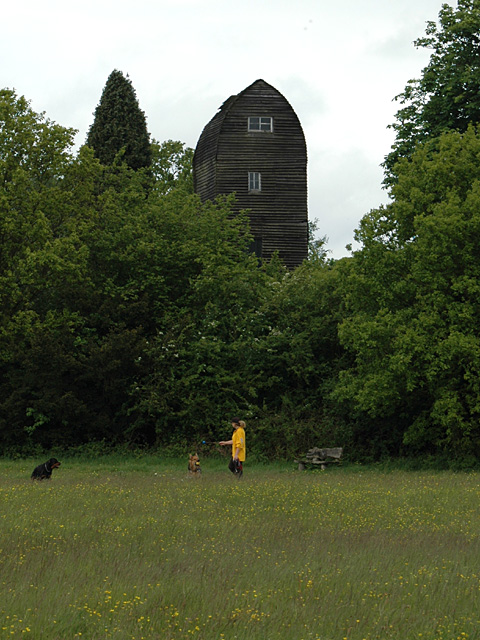
- Tadworth Mill

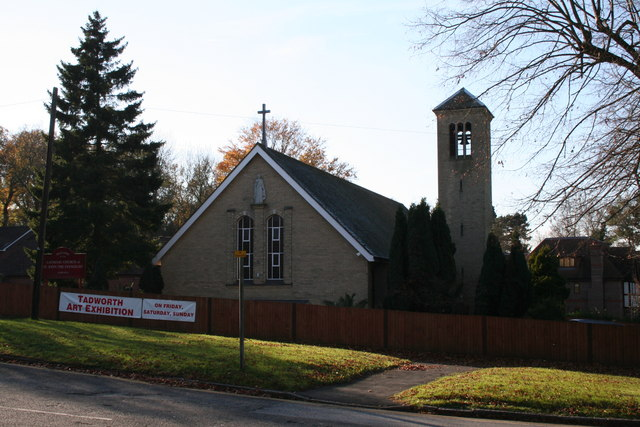
- Roman Catholic Church of St. John the Evangelist, The Avenue, Tadworth

- Location within Surrey
- Population: 9,522
- OS grid reference: TQ2256
- District: Reigate and Banstead
- Shire county: Surrey
- Region: South East
- Country: England
- Sovereign state: United Kingdom
- Post town: Tadworth
- Postcode district: KT20
- Dialling code: 01737
- Police: Surrey
- Fire: Surrey
- Ambulance: South East Coast
- UK Parliament: Reigate

Tadworth is a large suburban village in Surrey, England in the south-east of the Epsom Downs, part of the North Downs. It forms part of the Borough of Reigate and Banstead. At the 2021 census, Tadworth (and Walton-on-the-Hill) had a population of 7,095.

== History ==
=== Neolithic and Roman period in Britain ===
On a small farm to the north-west, South Tadworth Farm, directly at the top of the westward-facing Langley Vale and south of the Epsom Downs Racecourse, is an Iron Age Banjo enclosure, a term used by archaeologists for a distinctive type of prehistoric settlement. They were mostly constructed and used during the Middle Iron Age (400–100 BC), although some remained in use up to the time of the Roman Conquest (43 AD).

There are three more rectangular enclosures, which may be mentioned here as being connected in all probability with the settlement of which this villa was part, though they are actually over the border of Banstead parish. Two of these are south of the two windmills south of Tadworth. They are well-marked, nearly square enclosures, with a mound and ditch and gateways to the east or southeast. They are east of the road from Betchworth to Banstead.

The third is west of the road, and very close to Walton village; but though on land known commonly as Walton Heath, is actually on the Banstead side of the boundary. It is larger than the others, less well-preserved, and with a gateway to the north-west. Roman tiles may be found in or near all three. These enclosures have been commonly referred to as the 'Roman Camps' on Walton Heath, but it is not obvious that they were camps.

=== Middle Ages ===
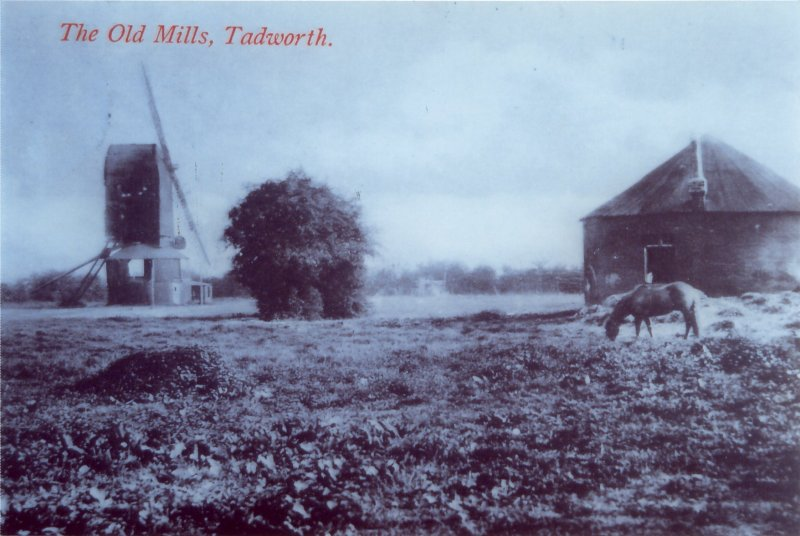
Some of the windmills, c. 1910

Tadworth appears in Domesday Book of 1086 as Tadeorde and Tadorne. It was held partly by Halsart from William de Braiose and partly by Radulf (Ralph) from the Bishop of Bayeux. Its Domesday assets were: two hides. It had five ploughs, woodland worth four hogs. It rendered £3 15s 0d. Manorialism operated for the ensuing centuries.

During this period the listed mills were erected in the south.

==== North Tadworth Manor ====
In 1273 John and James, sons of William Haunsard lord of North Tadworth Manor, gave a carucate of land, 2 acres of pasture, 12 acres of wood, and 20s. rent in North Tadworth and Little Bookham to the Priory of St Mary Overy—they held until the Dissolution of the Monasteries. However, in 1524 they gave it with the rectory of Banstead to William Coltson and Richard Moys and Elizabeth his wife for a term of forty years, which was widened to complete ownership in effect by Henry VIII. From the Crown to Thomas Walson and Robert Moys, eventually the manor was given up to the latter entirely and stayed in his family until his grandson Henry who held court in 1648. At Henry Moys' death the manor passed to his five sisters and co-heirs. In 1659 4/5 of the owners finally released their income and rights to Christopher Buckle of Burgh (Burgh Heath, see Domesday section for example in Kingswood). Only in 1663 did he acquire the remaining fifth. Since that time North Tadworth has been held as part of the manor of Burgh in Banstead parish.

==== South Tadworth Manor ====
No Charter, Assize Roll, Patent Roll or other manuscript has been found to explain how the Merton Priory came by the manor of South Tadworth, in Domesday Tadeorde, but the priory gained it around the same time when the priory gained Banstead Manor; for they held it in 1291. As with the other manor, this manor was held by a priory until Henry VIII's dissolution of the monasteries. Henry VIII wanted this land as his own so attached it to the wide, not all joined up, honour of Hampton Court. In 1553 Edward VI granted it in fee to Edward Harendon, also seen as Herrenden, whose children relinquished it from one to the other by fine.

In 1631–32 Thomas Grymes acquired it leaving it to his son who became Sir George Grymes; in the English Civil War Robert Wilson acquired and conveyed it to Leonard Wessel [sic] in 1694, who held the manor for ten years during which time he rebuilt in into today's Grade I listed Queen Anne building, children's home and charity headquarters, Tadworth Court. Later an Act of Parliament enabled a fee tail to be cleared off to sell the manor for lack of descendants of John Fleetwood who earlier acquired it, selling it to William Mabbot. Mabbot died at Tadworth Court in 1764, having devised his property to his wife, Lady Rhoda Delves and daughter Rhoda, who with Edward Beaver sold the Court to Sir Henry Harpur in 1773. Robert Hudson and later his widow held from 1808 to c. 1860 followed by Lord Chief Justice Sir Charles Russell, created later first Baron Russell of Killowen and held from 1900 by C. D. Morton.

==== Rectory Manors of Banstead ====
These were held by St Mary Overie Priory until the dissolution and at various times included the above two manors and the manor of Southmerfield.

In 1732 Edward Fulham, son and heir of Anne daughter and eventually heir of Robert Wayth, sold his fifth share to Christopher Buckle. After this time the entire rectory descended with the advowson (right to call a vicar), and the Earl of Egmont is the present impropriator of the great tithes with the exception of those in South Tadworth, which apparently passed out of the hands of the owner of the rectory in 1551. Theoretically therefore chancel repair liability can apply to those lay impropriators who acquired the land of the South Tadworth manor of 1551 and of the 1911 Earl of Egmont's Banstead Manor in the village of Banstead which he bought in 1847.

=== Post Reformation ===
During this period South Tadworth manor's purchasing Lord of the Manor, Leonard Wessels rebuilt the manor on its site and renamed it Tadworth Court in 1700.

=== Post Industrial Revolution ===
In 1848, the publisher Samuel Lewis described the place only under Banstead, where the living was a perpetual curacy and "A place of worship for dissenters in Tadworth"; much of the proverbial Banstead Mutton pasture was at that time being replaced by tilled fields. The great tithes were commuted for £393, the vicarial lesser tithes for £300, and a rent-charge of £201. 5. 9. was payable to the trustees of Newport Grammar School; the glebe (of Banstead) consisted of 6½ acres.

In 1874 a school board was formed for Banstead, Tadworth, and Kingswood, and in 1875 Tadworth and Kingswood School was opened by the board, now Kingswood Primary School.

Still in 1911 topographer and historian H. E. Malden describes Tadworth in detail but summarises it as "Tadworth is a hamlet on the Reigate road, included now in the ecclesiastical district of Kingswood". However, by that date there was "a Baptist chapel at Tadworth".

The British Transport Police's training headquarters was located at a site between Tadworth and Walton-on-the-Hill until it was closed in 2010. The Dog Section Training School which shared the site was relocated to Keston at this time, to the same location as the Metropolitan Police Dog Training School.

== Geography ==
Neighbouring settlements include Walton-on-the-Hill, Kingswood, Epsom, Burgh Heath, Banstead, Reigate. Tadworth lay within the Copthorne hundred, an administrative division devised by the Saxons and later adopted by the Normans.

There are no watercourses draining the area as the chalk easily absorbs water on the Downs. The Tattenham Corner Branch Line forms a deep, curved cutting running past gardens in the centre of the village as it turns to the racecourse to the north, and arrives from a tunnel immediately south of the Tadworth Roundabout preserving the gently wooded heath there.

The village adjoins in its north-west corner the top of Langley Vale, topped by the Iron Age enclosure in South Tadworth Farm. Epsom Downs Racecourse is home to The Derby and forms a contiguous development with the Tattenhams, a ward consisting of: the neighbourhoods of Great Tattenhams in the north by Nork, Banstead; Little Tattenhams and Tattenham Corner, see Tattenham Corner.

=== Elevation, geology and soil ===
The entire village sits on top of the North Downs and, taken as a whole, slopes very gradually from the north from 180m AOD in the south to 151m AOD at the top of Langley Vale (Downsway Close/Kingswood Road). Tadworth is roughly rectangular and is under a mile broad as it has historically been taken to include Banstead Heath to the south, on which it was placed.

Its geology is that of the North Downs (see Surrey – Geology); as to soil, Chipstead, Banstead and Tadworth have the first free-draining, slightly acid loamy soil that tops the wider downs to Guildford and is found around Dorking; it is seen further along the Hog's Back along its northern side as well in Surrey.

== Local government ==
Surrey County Council elected every four years, has one representative; Rebecca Paul (Conservative Party)

Three councillors sit on Reigate and Banstead borough council, who are:

In Office Since	Member	Ward
2023	Ben Green	Lower Kingswood, Tadworth & Walton
2021	Zelanie Cooper	Lower Kingswood, Tadworth & Walton
2016	Rod Ashford	Lower Kingswood, Tadworth & Walton

== Landmarks ==
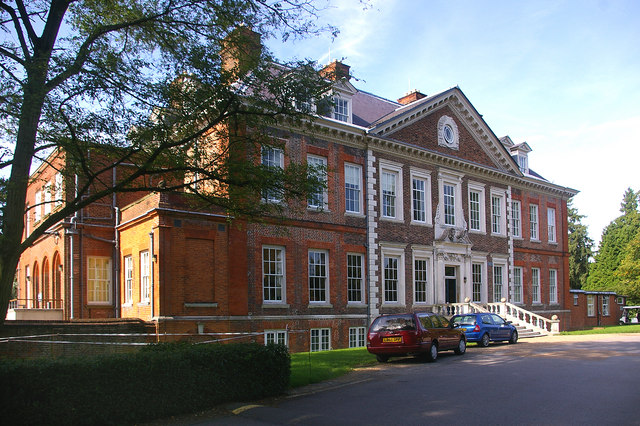
Tadworth Court Home to the Children's Trust

=== The Children's Trust ===
The Children's Trust, Tadworth a national charity providing special care for severely disabled children and rehabilitation to children with acquired brain injuries. This is housed in Tadworth Court. Tadworth Court is a grand Grade I listed building and was built at the height of Queen Anne style architecture in the very early 18th century—namely here in 1700 for Leonard Wessels, Lord of the Manor of Banstead.

=== The Water Tower ===
Tower House, Tower Road, Tadworth. This building was constructed in 1898 and provided water from the springs of the Sutton District Water Company in Sutton. This enabled substantial development to take place locally. The tower was decommissioned in the early 20th century in favour of one at Colley Hill. The tower has been a prominent landmark on the edge of the heath and now is a domestic residence.

== Demography ==
At the 2001 Census Tadworth had a population of 9,522 in 3,792 households.

At the 2021 Census, the ecclesiastical parish of Tadworth had a population of 5,803 in 2,353 households.

== Religious buildings ==
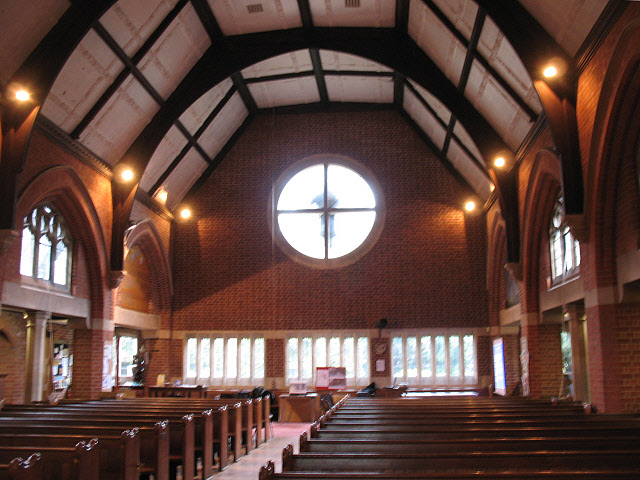
Church of the Good Shepherd, Tadworth

The Church of The Good Shepherd is the local Anglican church, which celebrated its centenary in 2012. It is open daily and has a church hall.

St. John the Evangelist is the local Roman Catholic church for the area. It is a modern church and parish, being built and created in the mid-twentieth century.

== Sport ==
Tadworth has a Non-League football club Banstead Athletic F.C. who play at Merland Rise.

Tadworth Athletic Club is Tadworth's local running club with men's and women's teams. Formed in 1981, they train on local roads in the winter and on the Downs in the summer every Tuesday evening. The teams participate in the Surrey Cross-Country League and the Surrey Road Running League. The men's team, led by David Williamson, won the Surrey Road League in 2012. Each January, the club organises the Tadworth Ten race that attracts hundreds of runners. It starts and ends at Epsom Downs Racecourse and passes through Tadworth and Walton-on-the-Hill.

Tadworth Cricket Club is situated on the south-east side of the B2032. It has picturesque grounds surrounded by woodland. The club was founded in 1903, and at that time the club was originally based at a site some 400 yards north of where it is currently situated. It is not known exactly when the club moved to its present site, but it is believed to be before World War I. The 'Green' was substantially smaller then and lacked a pavilion.

In 1951 the club members built a new pavilion near the present site. The pavilion, along with the whole of the clubs' records and ground equipment, were destroyed by fire. The new pavilion was opened by Alf Gover (formerly of Surrey CCC and England) during Tadworth Village week in 1993. During the summer months, cricket is played at the ground by members of the Club.

== Culture and community ==
=== Commerce ===
The village has two, or possibly three, small shopping areas. The largest is around the station, approximately in the centre of the Tadworth area. There is another towards the south of the area, nearer to Walton Heath, and a third, known locally as Shelvers Hill, to the north, near to Epsom Downs. The shops in these areas include a butcher's shop, fishmonger and game dealer, baker, greengrocer and delicatessen.

There are also two estate agents, a travel agent, an off licence, a gift shop, several restaurants and two newsagents/general stores. Services include one bank, a post office, a medical centre, a dentist, an optician, tyre specialist and a vet's surgery and three public houses.

=== Scouting ===
1st Tadworth Sea Scout Group was registered on 2 December 1947, originally 1st Tadworth (Church of the Good Shepherd). They became Sea Scouts in 1997 following the Scout Masters' passion for sailing. The group falls under Banstead District. and follows the Policies, Organisation and Rules of the UK Scout Association.

== Education ==
- St John's Nursery School is situated to the side of St John's catholic church on The Avenue.
- Tadworth Primary School is located on the Tadworth Park estate to the east of the village centre, with entrances on Heathcote and Tadorne Road.
- The nearest secondary school is The Beacon School, Banstead with alternative schools in Ashtead, Epsom or Reigate.
- Independent co-educational preparatory school, Chinthurst School is located to the south of the village, on the road to Walton-on-the-Hill, and caters for boys and girls aged two to eleven years. Founded in 1908.

== Transport ==
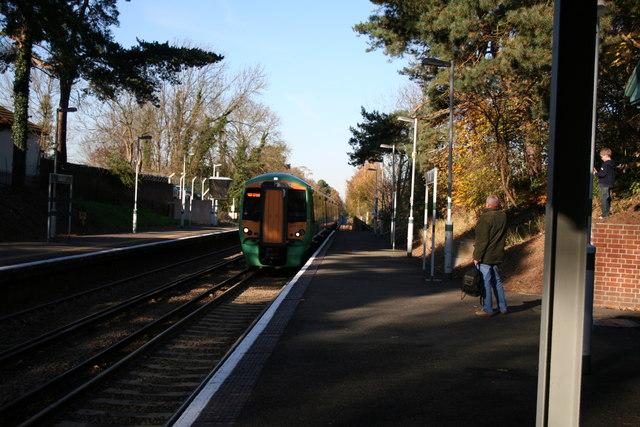
Tadworth Station

=== Roads ===
The wood-lined Brighton Road (A217) marks the eastern boundary of Tadworth as a dual carriageway with direct access to Junction 8 (Reigate Hill) of the M25 London Orbital Motorway.

=== Buses ===
There are two Metrobus services which operate through the village. Route 420 runs from Sutton through Banstead, Tadworth following the A217 through Reigate and terminates at Whitebushes, with a few services extended to Gatwick Airport. Route 460 runs from Epsom through Epsom Downs, Tadworth, Reigate, Gatwick Airport and then Crawley Bus Station.

=== Rail ===
There are two National Rail stations, Tadworth, close to the centre of the village, and Tattenham Corner railway station to the north, adjoining Epsom Downs. Despite being outside Greater London, both stations are in London fare zone 6. Trains are operated by Southern, with a typical off-peak service of two trains per hour to London Bridge (non-stop from Norwood Junction).
