= Beechholme =

Former children's home and residential school in Banstead, England

Coordinates: 51.3286°N 0.2246°W

The entrance to Beechholme from Fir Tree Road

Beechholme was a residential school and children's home in Fir Tree Road, Banstead, Surrey. It was founded in 1879 as the Kensington and Chelsea District School, Banstead, became Banstead Residential School in 1930, before adopting its final name in 1953. It was initially intended for poor children from the slums of Kensington and Chelsea and was run under a village system. Children from other London boroughs joined the school from 1913 onwards. Beechholme closed in June 1975. The buildings were demolished and the site is now occupied by the High Beeches estate. Historical allegations of child abuse at Beechholme have been reported to Surrey Police and a survivors' group has been formed.

== Description ==
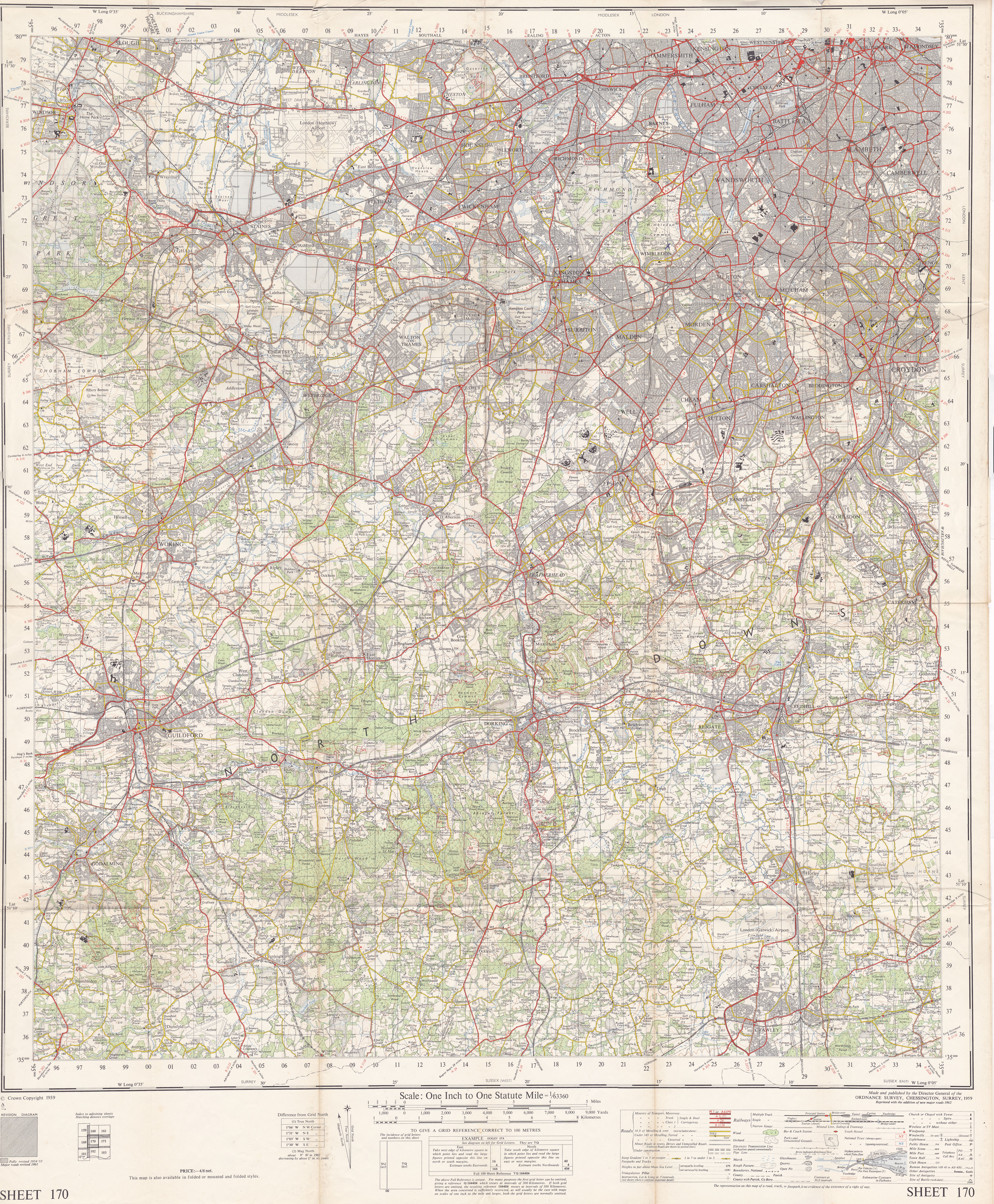
Map showing Beechholme in 1959: The red circle on the right is Banstead railway station.

Known as the Kensington and Chelsea District School, Banstead, when it opened in 1880, Beechholme was a residential school in north Surrey, England. The living accommodation consisted of 24 large, detached houses on both sides of a long, tree-lined avenue. The houses were named after trees and shrubs (e.g. Beech, Oak, Cedar, Acacia) and were autonomous,"family" units, managed by "house parents" and run under a "Cottage Home" philosophy. Each of the 16 girls' houses could accommodate up to 30 pupils, while each of the seven boys' houses could accommodate up to 40. A report published in December 1881 noted that, after its first year of opening, around 500 children were attending the school, split roughly equally between girls and boys. Trades taught to the male pupils included shoemaking, tailoring, carpentry, plumbing, baking and gardening. Girls had the opportunity to learn needlework, but were generally being prepared for careers in domestic service.

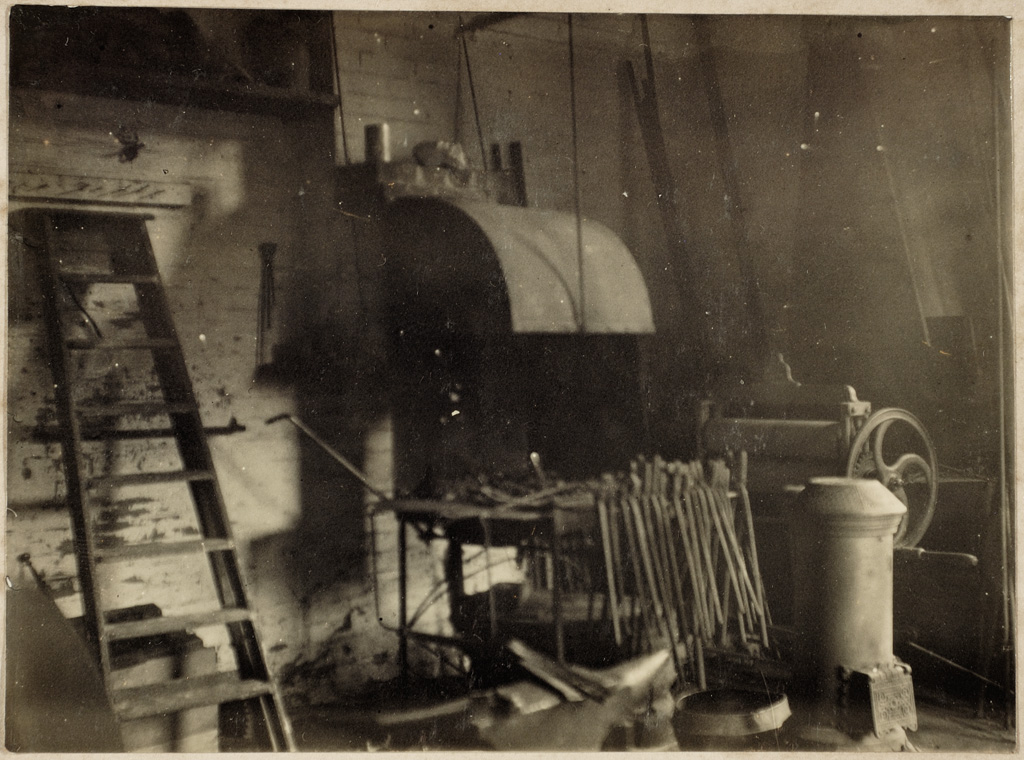
Blacksmith's forge c. 1895

Alongside the pupils' living accommodation, were teaching and administrative buildings (including a blacksmiths' forge and a sewing room), a porters' lodge, a band room and a library. The school superintendent and matron had individual residences on site and there was a shared house for other staff. The central laundry building opened in 1882 and there was also an outdoor swimming pool. There were two infirmaries, one of which was for pupils suffering from infectious diseases. Newly arrived pupils were subject to a period of quarantine in one of two dedicated houses. The school was served by a private siding connected to the Epsom Downs branch line.

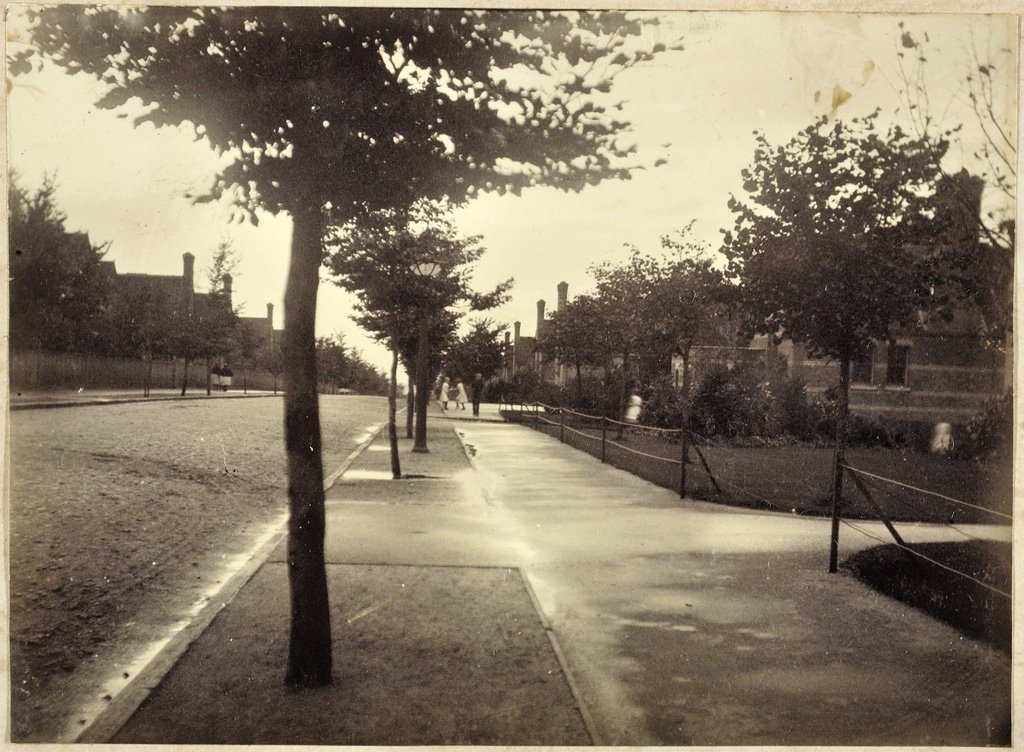
Girls' cottages c. 1895

All children were required to attend religious services in the Chapel of the Good Shepherd on the school site. The vicar of Banstead was also the chaplain, but later this responsibility was transferred to a local curate. A two-manual organ was installed in the chapel in 1903 and, in January 1921, a memorial window was dedicated to former pupils who had died in the First World War. The building was destroyed by fire in the early hours of 24 February 1968 and thereafter, children attended services at St Paul's Church, Warren Road, Nork.

Conditions at Beechholme were harsh, but were typical of private residential schools of the same era. Contact between the children and their parents was minimised. There are local newspaper reports of pantomimes, concerts and other performances put on by pupils at the school, which residents from the Banstead area were invited to attend, as well as an annual fête and sports day. Pupils were given the opportunity to go on school-organised holidays to the south coast and Isle of Wight.

== History ==
The Kensington and Chelsea School District was created on 15 August 1876. Soon afterwards, it purchased 140 acres (57 ha) of land at Banstead, Surrey, for a new residential school for £7414 16s 6p. The aim was to "rehabilitate children subject to the Poor Law" who had previously "been left with adults in workhouses" in the district. The school was designed by the architects, Arthur and Christopher Harston, and the initial 33 buildings were constructed at a cost of £57,000. The first children were admitted to the school in September 1880.

In 1916, children from St Marylebone Parish began attending the school, following the closure of a previous facility at Southall. In 1930, the name was changed to "Banstead Residential School" and, in the same decade, children began to attend local secondary schools run by Surrey County Council. During the Second World War, pupils were moved to accommodation in Reigate and their places were taken by young, disabled evacuees from London.

Following the implementation of the Education Act 1944, the emphasis of school began to change and was refocused away from teaching and towards providing child care. In 1953, it became known as "Beechholme". In 1965, the Greater London Council succeeded the London County Council and responsibility for the school passed to the London Borough of Wandsworth.

By the mid-1960s, increasing running costs, coupled with a desire for children in care to live in the communities from which they came, meant that closure was being considered. A thanksgiving service for the work of the school took place at St Paul's Church, Nork, on 20 October 1974 and Beechholme closed on 13 June the following year. All buildings were demolished and the site is now occupied by the High Beeches housing estate. The playing fields, part of which became Beechholme Recreation Ground, were passed to Reigate and Banstead Borough Council.

The London Metropolitan Archives hold records of the children who resided at the school. Former residents of the home include the television presenter Dilly Braimoh, who produced a television programme on Beechholme and its former residents.

== Accusations of child abuse ==
Since Beechholme closed, allegations of historic child abuse at the school have been made, some of which have been reported to Surrey Police. A survivors' group has been formed. One former pupil, who arrived at the school in 1960, described it as a "rape factory" and a "sweet shop" for paedophiles, alleging that he was "abused dozens of times in the two years that I was there". Another, who does not claim he was sexually abused, stated that staff "thought it was their right to knock you around". A claim has been made of a link between an abuser at the Shirley Oaks Children's Home near Croydon and staff at Beechholme. Jimmy Savile may also have abused children at the school.

== Bibliography ==
- Maciejewski, Ralph (2010). Beechholme : A children's village. Banstead: Banstead History Research Group. ISBN 978-0-95-507684-8.
- Mitchell, Vic; Smith, Keith (1992). West Croydon to Epsom. Midhurst: Middleton Press. ISBN 978-1-87-379308-4.
- Sweetman, John, ed. (2005) [1993]. The history of Banstead. Vol. II (2nd ed.). Banstead: Banstead History Research Group. ISBN 978-0-95-127419-4.
