= Nork, Surrey =

Suburb in Surrey, England

Coordinates: 51.323°N 0.220°W

Nork
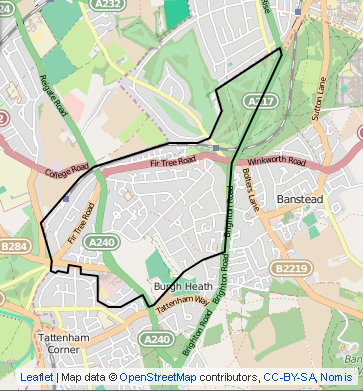
- Nork ward in 2011, outlined in black

- Location within Surrey
- Area: 3.63 km^{2} (1.40 sq mi)
- Population: 7,559 (2011 Census)
  - Density: 2,082/km^{2} (5,390/sq mi)
- OS grid reference: TQ241598
- District: Reigate and Banstead
- Shire county: Surrey
- Region: South East
- Country: England
- Sovereign state: United Kingdom
- Post town: Banstead
- Postcode district: SM7
- Post town: Epsom
- Postcode district: KT17
- Dialling code: 01737
- Police: Surrey
- Fire: Surrey
- Ambulance: South East Coast
- UK Parliament: Reigate

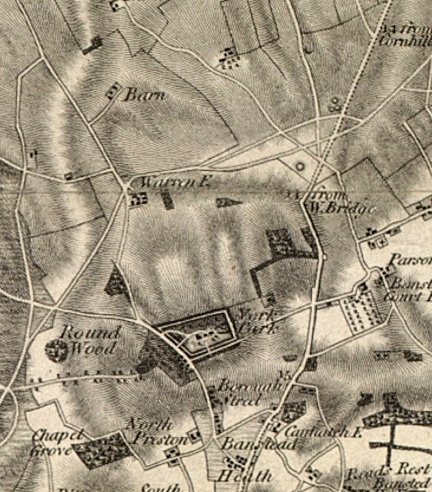
1816 OS map. Almost the only buildings in what is now Nork were Nork House, Great Burgh, and Warren Farm

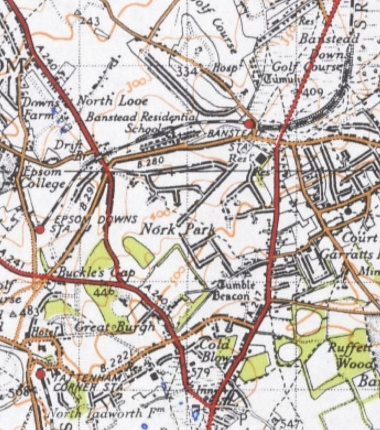
1945 OS map. About half of the housing estates remained to be built; e.g. Nork Way stops at Beacon Way

Nork is a residential area of the borough of Reigate and Banstead in Surrey and borders Greater London, England. Nork is separated from its post town Banstead only by the A217 dual carriageway, and the built-up area is also contiguous with similar parts of Tattenham Corner and Burgh Heath. A thin belt of more open land separates it from the communities to the north: Epsom, Ewell, Cheam and Belmont. There are two parades of shops, one called the Driftbridge and another at the north-eastern end of Nork Way, the street which runs centrally through the residential area. Nork lies on chalk near the top of the gentle north-facing slope of the North Downs, 175 m (575 ft) above sea level at its highest point.

== History ==
It has been suggested that the word "Nork", as well as "Nore" and "Nower", might derive from the Latin noverca, which literally means a stepmother, but which was applied to a feature which dominates, and thus weakens, a fortified camp. Others consider it more likely to be derived from the Old English word "nook", meaning secluded, tranquil and a corner. A third proposed derivation is from "northern oak".

The first recorded application of the name was to a "Nork close" (enclosed field) in 1723. It was then applied to Nork House, built in 1740 by Christopher Buckle (1684–1759). The Buckle family were owners of the adjacent Burgh Manor from 1614 to 1847. In the 18th and 19th centuries Nork could be considered an agricultural hamlet of Banstead village, covering the fields and buildings in the extensive grounds of Nork Park (surrounding Nork House). The line of trees planted to mark the park's northern boundary has given its name to Fir Tree Road. John Burton, author of Iter Surriense et Sussexiense, stayed at Nork House in 1752, and described at length the ingenious waterworks by which water was raised from a very deep well and distributed over the slopes of a dry down.

In 1834 a celebrated highway robbery and murder occurred along what is now Yew Tree Bottom road where it joins the Reigate Road (Purcell's Gap). A Mr Richardson, returning from the Epsom cornmarket to Bletchingley, had dismounted on account of the steep climb, and was ambushed by two men whom he had considered suspicious on his outward trip that morning. Later in that century the railway arrived (1865), primarily to serve Epsom Racecourse. Then in 1880 a large "cottage home" for children opened along the northern edge of Nork, between Fir Tree Road and the railway line. It was originally called "The Kensington and Chelsea District School" and later "Beechholme". At its peak, over 400 children were accommodated. The school closed in 1974 and the area was rebuilt with modern housing.

In the 19th century, the Buckle family had sold their estates to the Perceval/Arden family, who in turn sold them to the Colman family, of mustard fame. In 1923, the Nork estate was sold to a development company and Nork House itself was demolished in 1939. Housing development became rapid after 1923, and in 1925 the Nork Residents' Association was formed, publishing the Nork Quarterly, a bulletin that still appears regularly today. Nork began to be used as an official place name outside of the park itself from 1965 when Banstead was divided into two wards named "Banstead Village" and "Nork", equal in population and number of councillors.

During World War II, Nork received occasional damage from bombs, V-1 flying bombs and crashed aircraft. Some fortifications were built in preparation for an invasion, and later Canadian and British soldiers were stationed in Nork Park, occupying some of the buildings remaining from the estate as well as specially constructed Nissen huts. After the war, the Nissen huts were utilised by the council as temporary accommodation for council tenants, then demolished as tenants were moved into prefabs.

Housing development continued after a break during the war. Amongst the last large-scale developments were the Rose Bushes estate in the 1960s and the High Beeches estate in the 1970s. Recently, in-fill development has converted some of the large rear gardens of the original development into small housing schemes; there is opposition to this from some local residents and their elected representatives.

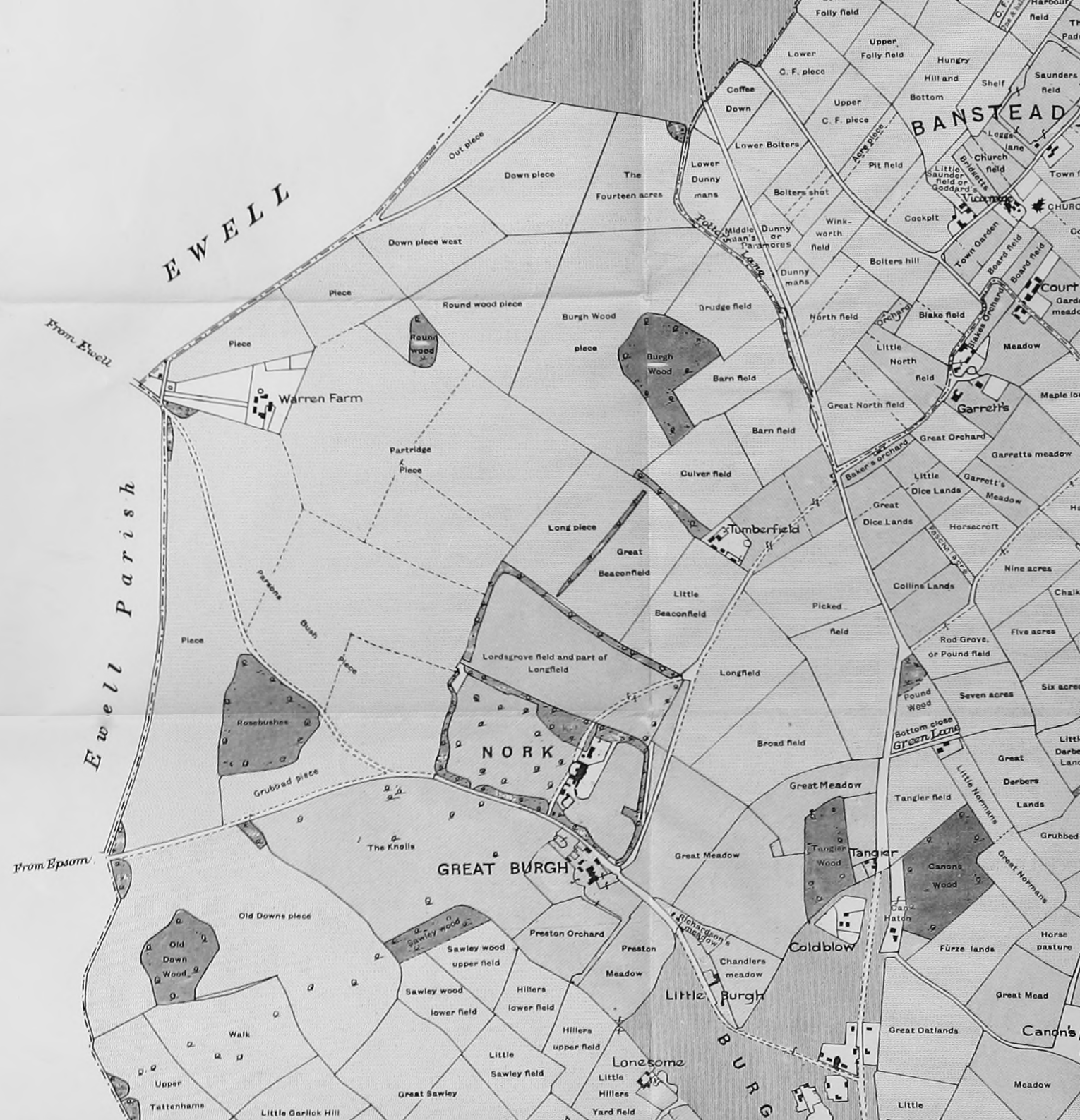
Map of much of present-day Nork as it was in 1841. Modern street names often derive from features on this map. The map must be turned 25° clockwise to point north.

== Monuments and buildings of note ==
In a front garden along The Drive lies Tumble Beacon, a scheduled ancient monument. Originally it was a prehistoric bowl barrow, a funeral monument situated, as is typical, on one of the highest prominences in the region. At latest in Tudor times, it was built up to serve as a beacon where a fire would be lit to warn of the approach of hostile forces. In World War II an air-raid shelter was dug inside.

A group of Saxon burial mounds, or hlaews, lies in the north part of Nork ward on the part of Banstead Downs west of the main A217 road. When one was excavated in 1972, archaeologists found late 7th, or possibly early 8th, century artefacts, including a spear, knife, shield boss, hanging bowl and textile. The primary burial was of a well built and unusually tall (1.9 m; 6 ft) warrior, a regular horse rider, probably in his late 20s. Another five skeletons appeared to be centuries-later victims of the medieval gallows that gave rise to the local place name Gally Hills.

In 1912 the Colman family rebuilt the mansion called Great Burgh, over the Reigate Road from Nork House. This neo-Georgian house is now a Grade II listed building. It was used as a research establishment by the Distillers Company (during which time a number of important chemical processes were developed there), then by British Petroleum and Beecham Pharmaceuticals, and later as offices and accommodation by Toyota, who have their UK headquarters here. Since 2016, the original building has been occupied by the Science Group and their subsidiary Leatherhead Food Research. The house's architect Ernest Newton also designed the formal gardens and parterres.

Amongst "locally listed buildings" are two estate cottages (Driftways and Crossways) near the Driftbridge, both built about 1890, and West Lodge, a flint-built gatehouse for Nork House on the Reigate Road. A pair of 19th-century stone gate piers standing incongruously at the south end of Ruden Way are also from an entrance to the Nork Park estate. The former Drift Bridge Hotel (see next section) is locally listed partly because the teak used in its 1931 construction came from HMS Ganges, the Royal Navy's last sail-powered flagship.

== Amenities ==
The buildings in the area are predominantly detached or semi-detached houses. There is much inconsistency in style in the original developments of the inter-war years because different builders had purchased single plots. Such properties often have unusually large gardens (planning authorities sometimes limited density to 6 houses per acre). The streets typically have a grass verge with trees between road and pavement.

The shopping parade at the end of Nork Way consists of small convenience stores and local services such as newsagents (including a post office), restaurants, motor mechanics, a baker's and a pharmacy.

In the west part of Nork is another small shopping parade, known as The Driftbridge, named after the former Drift Bridge Hotel and adjacent garage at the crossroads of Fir Tree Road and the Reigate Road (A240). The hotel later became a Toby Inn and in 2007 was converted into apartments. There are now no hotels or pubs in Nork, the closest ones lying at the far end of Banstead village and at Tattenham Corner.

A smaller, third parade of shops lies just south of Nork ward, on Tattenham Way.

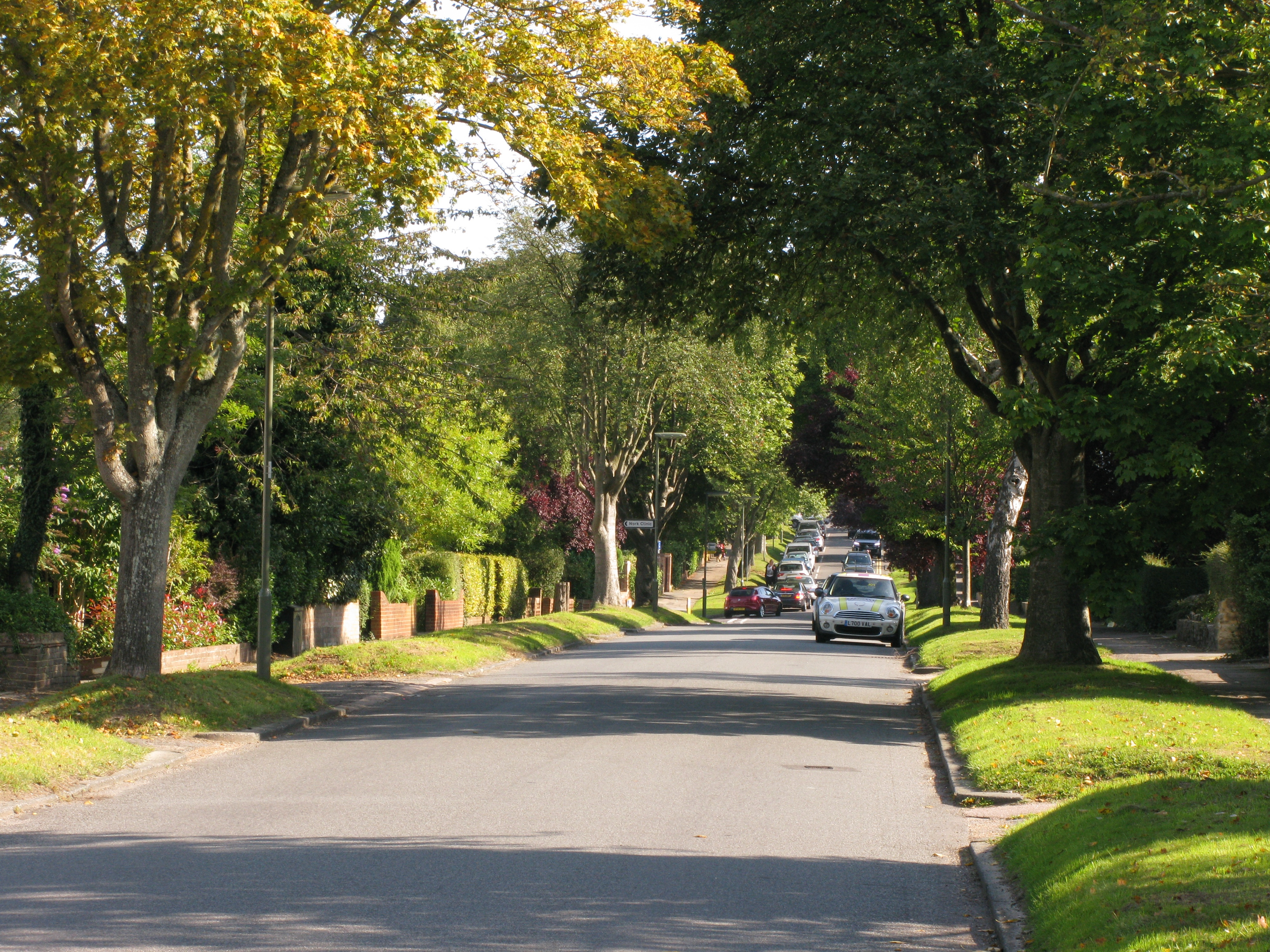
Nork Way

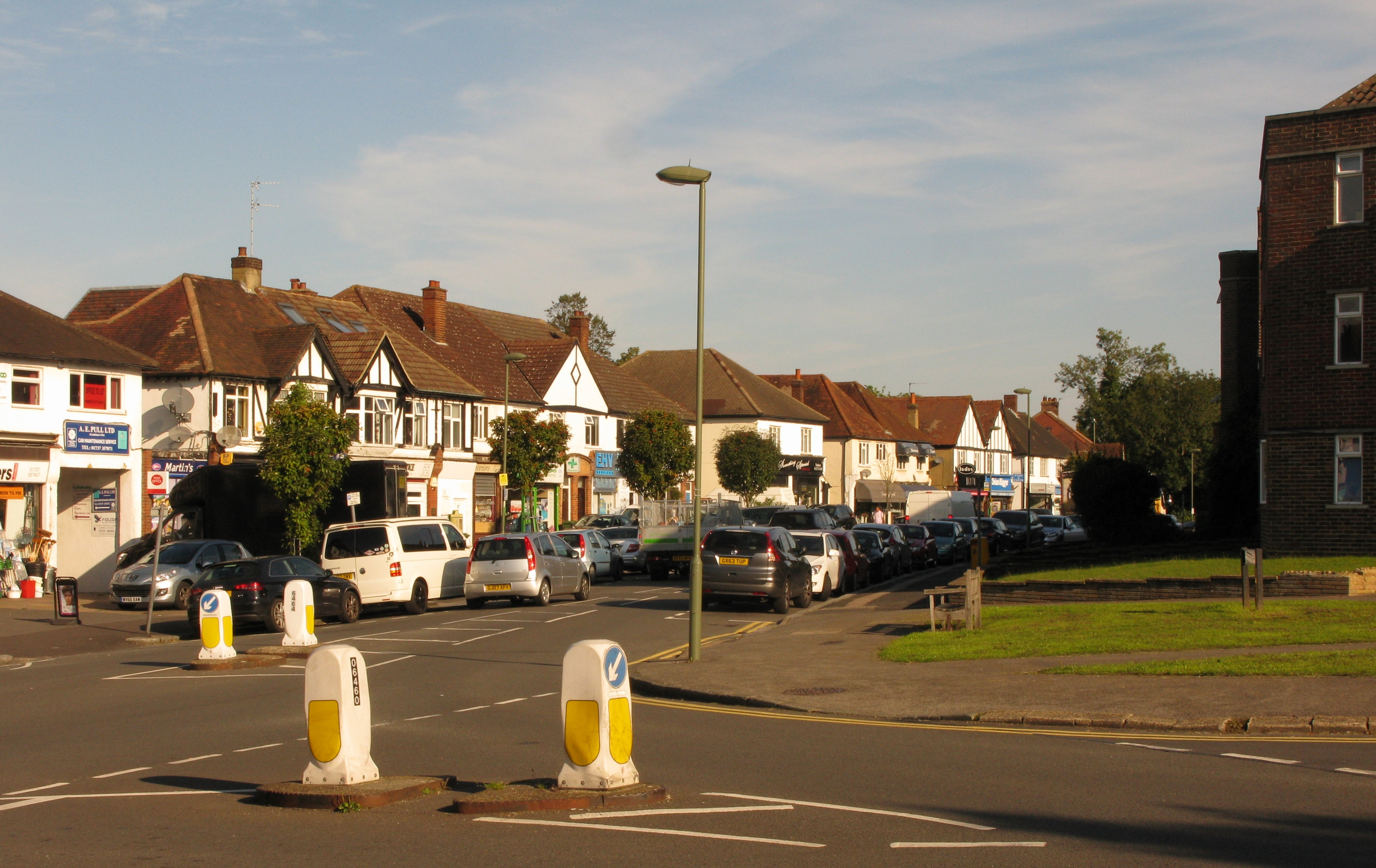
Nork shops

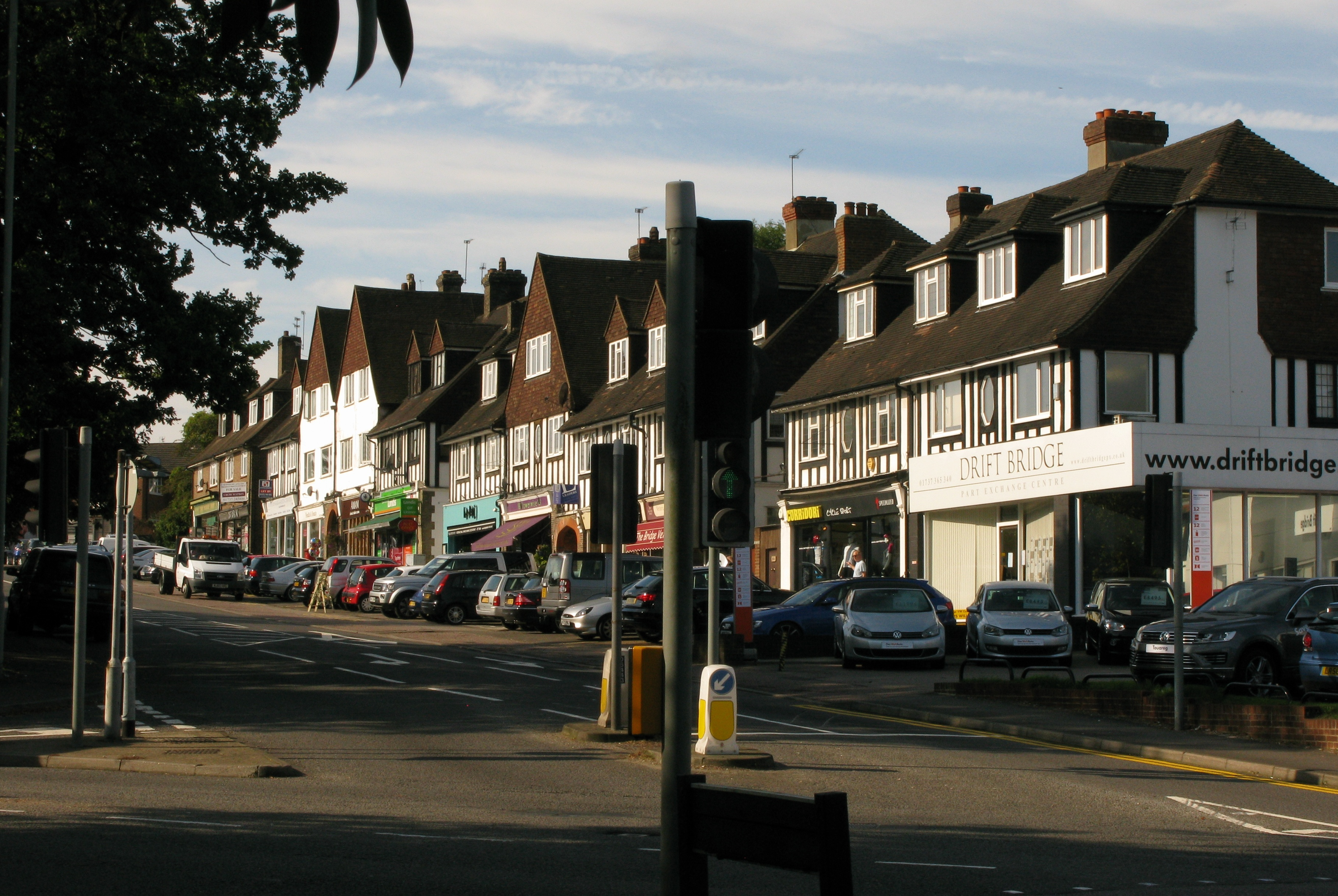
Parade at Driftbridge

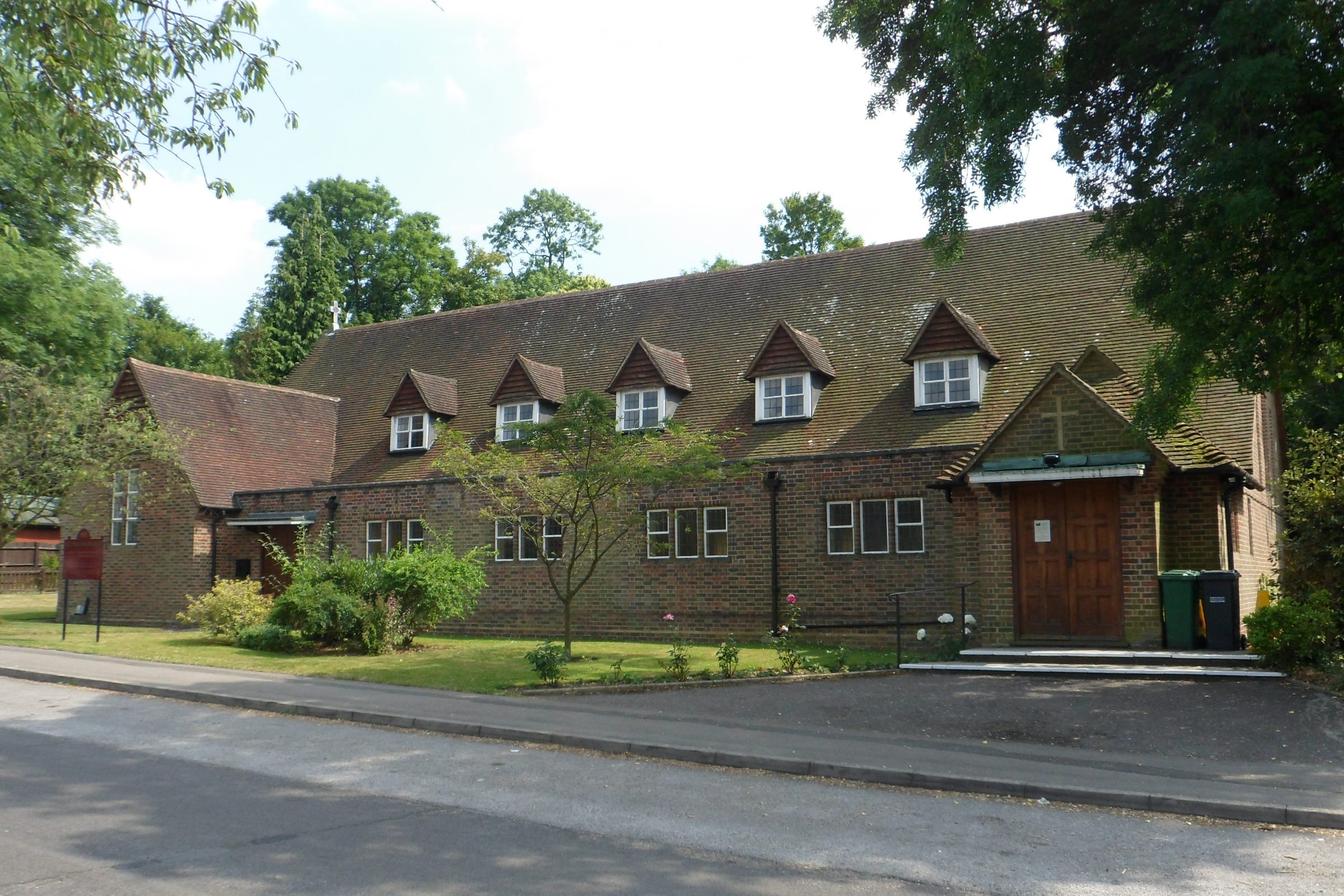
Church of St Paul

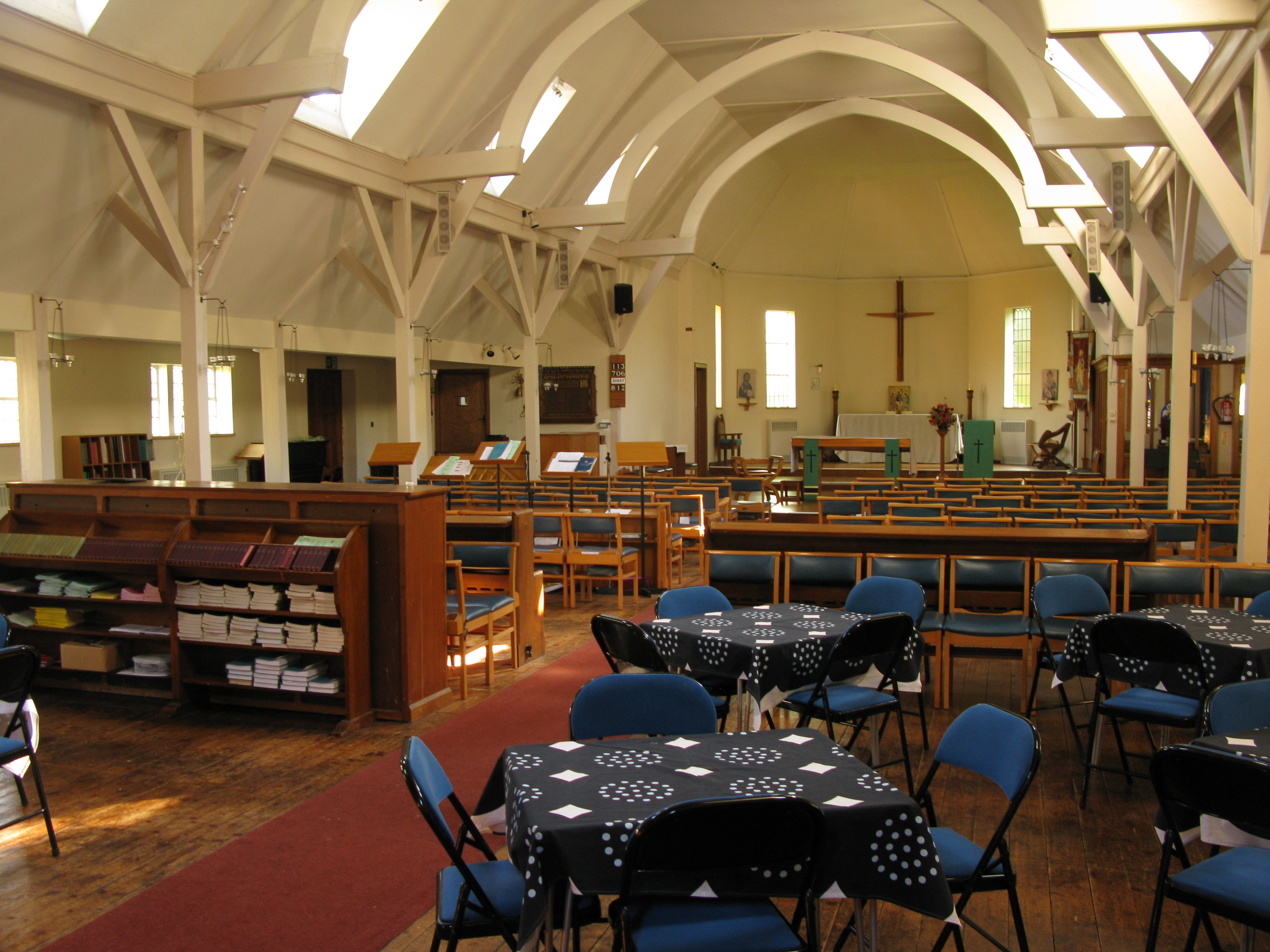
Interior of St Paul's

The Anglican church of St Paul in Warren Road was opened in 1930 specifically to serve the new housing estates in Nork. The Roman Catholic and Methodist churches for Banstead are also situated in the Nork ward: for more details see the list of places of worship in Reigate and Banstead.

These three churches each have a church hall. Other venues for local events and indoor sports are the community centre in Nork Park off Nork Way and Scout Ridge near Banstead Station.

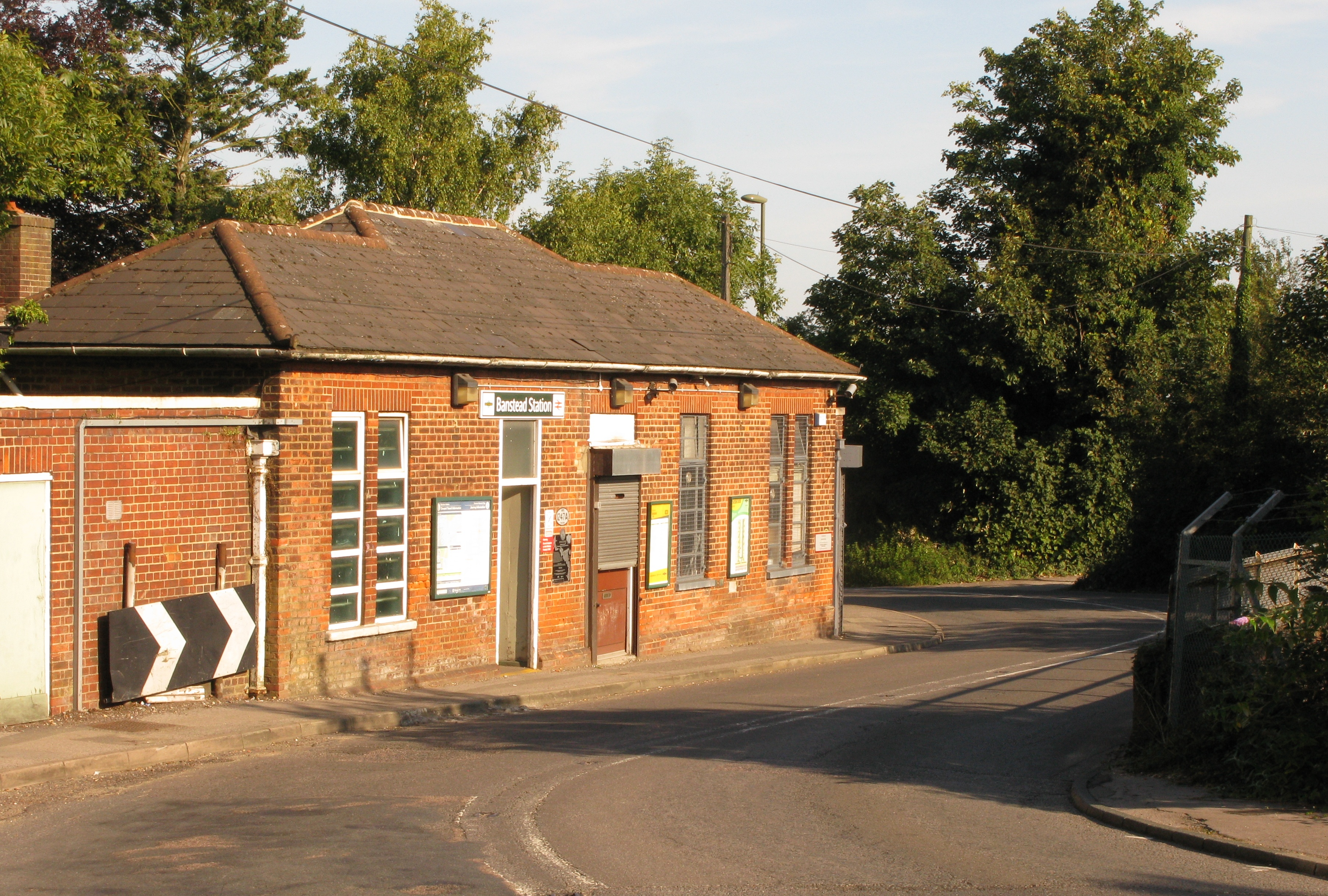
Banstead railway station

== Transport ==
Banstead railway station lies near the shops at the north end of Nork Way. It is on the single-track Epsom Downs branch line between Epsom Downs station (also officially in the Nork ward) and the main-line junction at Sutton, from where trains continue to London. When the line was opened in 1865 the end station at Epsom Downs had 9 platforms to cope with visitors to the racecourse, but in 1989 the station was resited and rebuilt with just one platform. Also within easy walking distance of parts of Nork is Tattenham Corner station, the end station of the Tattenham Corner Line from the mainline junction at Purley.

Nork is also served by several bus routes, some running through Nork itself (166, 318), and others accessible from nearby Tattenham Way (420), Banstead High Street (S1) or Tattenham Corner (460/480). Direct destinations include Epsom, Croydon, Sutton, Mitcham, Redhill, Gatwick Airport and Crawley.

== Schools ==
Warren Mead Infant School and Warren Mead Junior School are in Nork. The Beacon School is an academy secondary school located next to Nork Park, and was formerly known as Nork Park School. Confusingly, The Beacon School had been the name of a preparatory school on the site where Beacon Close now stands. Residents are also likely to send their children further afield for education.

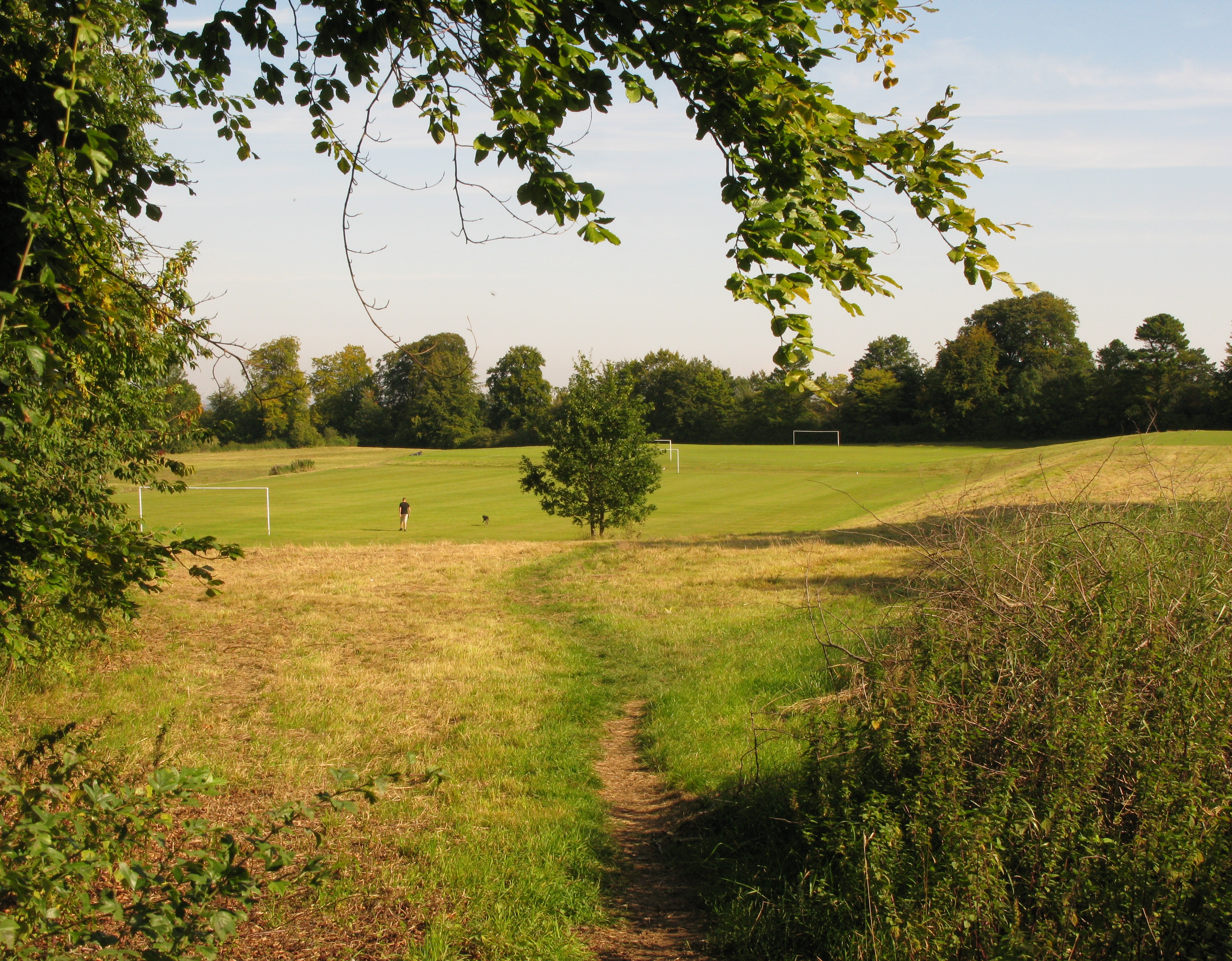
Playing fields in Nork Park

== Nork Park ==
Nork Park lies to the south of the main residential area, bordering Tattenham Corner and Burgh Heath. It derives from part of the 18th century park around the demolished Nork House, and was bought by the local council in 1947 from the landowner David Field. Subsequently, parts of the area have been used for grazing horses, cattle and goats, but now the entire area is accessible to the public. The Park is partly chalk grassland of value for its flora, and there are also hedgerows, avenues and areas of woodland, including a small arboretum. It is much used for dog walking. There are extensive areas of playing fields, tennis and basketball courts, an exercise trail, two children's playgrounds, and a community centre. Several car parks provide access and adjacent parking is also possible along Nork Way. The local community organises a popular open-air music festival called "Music in the Park" that runs one afternoon in summer; 2022 marked the 30th such event.

== Banstead Downs ==
Memorial to crashed pilot on Banstead Downs

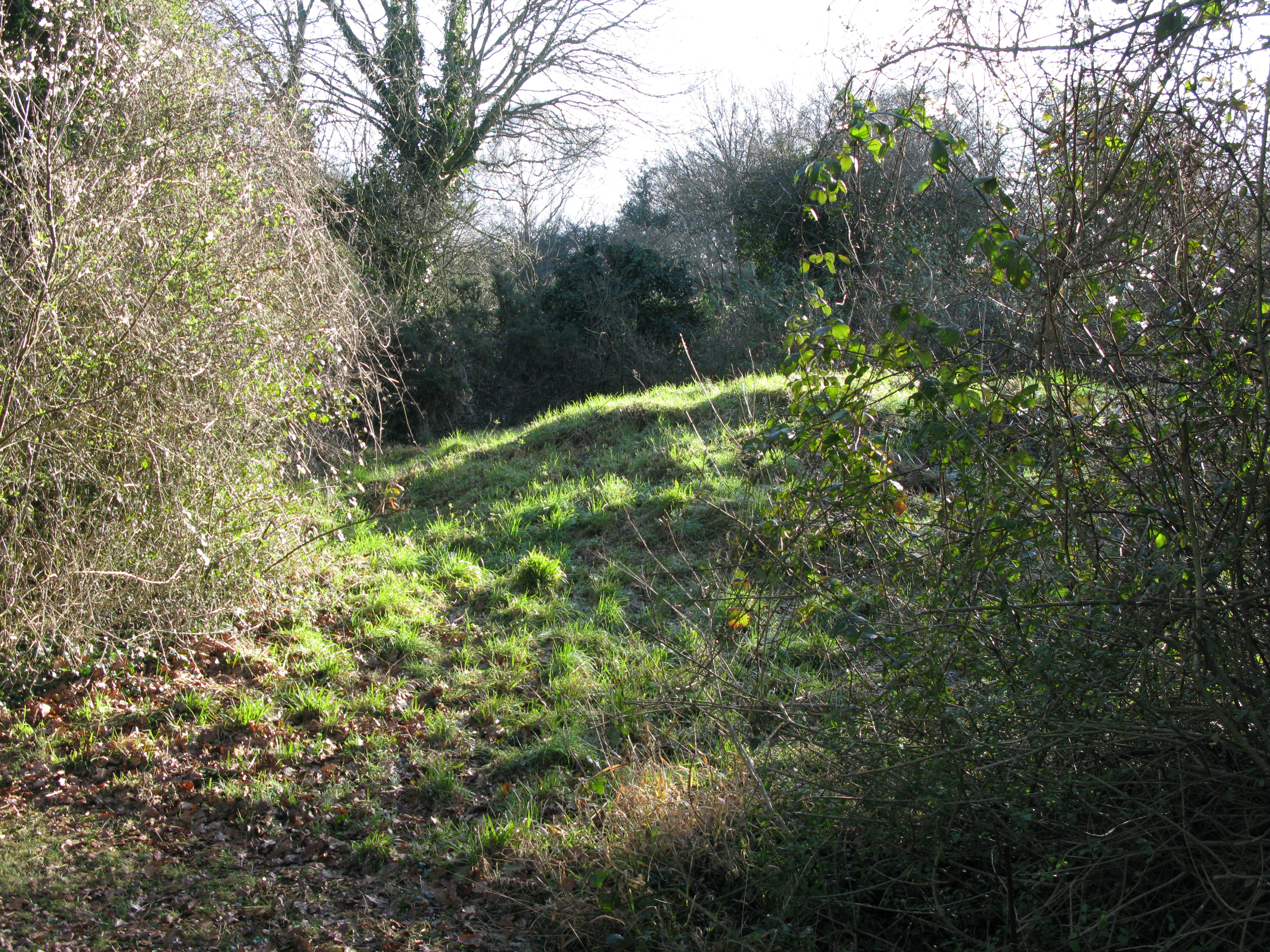
Gally Hills tumulus on Banstead Downs

About a third of Banstead Downs lies in the north of Nork ward, where it is occupied by a golf course. Banstead Downs has been designated a Site of Special Scientific Interest. The golf course provides a mixture of types of grassland with a rich chalk flora (including a number of locally rare plants) and areas of mixed scrub important for birds. (Over the whole of these downs 57 species of bird have been recorded, of which 44 have bred.) In addition there is some more mature oak and hawthorn woodland. The invertebrate fauna includes very rare and localised species.

Banstead Downs has been preserved as a result of a 16-year long legal battle at the end of the 19th century between the Commoners and Sir John Cradock-Hartopp, who wished to exploit the land for housing and topsoil. As a result, after 1893 the Downs has been administered by the Banstead Commons Conservators.

Near the 18th tee of the golf course is a memorial to an American pilot Lt Andrew Jackson, who bravely steered his plane away from houses, crashing here in 1944. Elsewhere on this golf course lies the Gally Hills ancient monument, described above.

The London Loop, a 240 km signed walk around London, passes through Nork here, crossing the Brighton Road (A217) just north of Banstead Crossroads. The walk is divided into sections designed to start and end at points accessible by public transport and Banstead Station forms one such "official" point of access.

== Demography ==
The 2011 census recorded the population as 7556 (cf. 7351 in 2001); 22% were under 18 and 19% over 65. The area is fairly prosperous and middle-class: of those residents aged 16–64, 38% had university or professional qualifications (England and Wales = 30%) and 79% were in employment (England and Wales = 71%). In 2018, only 0.5% of this age group were claiming out-of-work benefits (cf. 2.3% for Great Britain). In 2011, only 6% of households lacked a car and 60% had more than one. The population was 92% white with 90% of residents born in the UK.

== Political representation ==
As of 2022, all three Reigate & Banstead borough councillors for Nork Ward represent Nork Residents' Association. The Surrey County Councillor for the Nork and Tattenhams Ward is Nick Harrison (Nork and Tattenhams Residents' Association). The Member of Parliament for the Reigate constituency (of which all of Nork forms a part) is Rebecca Paul (Conservative). Before 2024 Nork was part of the Epsom and Ewell parliamentary constituency.

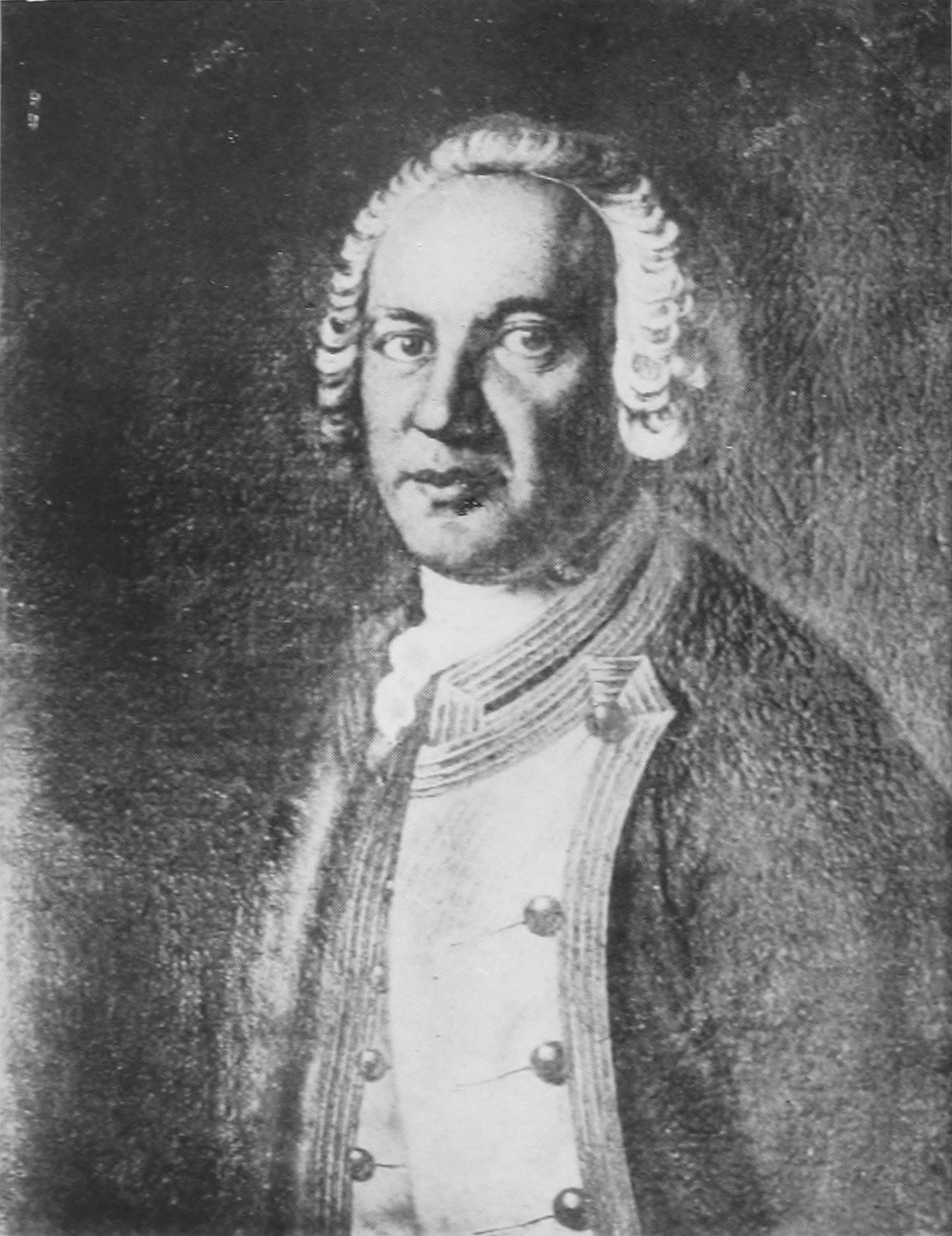
Admiral Matthew Buckle

== Notable residents ==
- Admiral Matthew Buckle (1718–1784)
- George James Perceval, 6th Earl of Egmont (1794–1874), admiral, Member of Parliament
- Frederick Edward Colman DL (1841–1900), managing director of Colman's the mustard manufacturers, bought Nork House in 1890 and lived there until his death; his family remained until 1923.
- The author and radio producer Simon Brett (1945–) grew up in Nork.
- The comedian David Walliams (1971–) grew up in Nork and was a lifeguard at Banstead Sports Centre.
