= Banstead Prisoner-of-War Camp =

World War II prisoner of war camp in England

Banstead Prisoner-of-War Camp was set up in 1939 in Banstead Woods in Surrey, England. The War Department requisitioned some land which was initially used as a military camp for the Canadian Army and then for the remainder of World War II as a prisoner-of-war camp for Italians and then for Germans.

The camp was given the name Westonacres Camp, No. 239.
