= Tattenham Corner =

Neighbourhood of Epsom, Surrey, England

Coordinates: 51.309°N 0.243°W

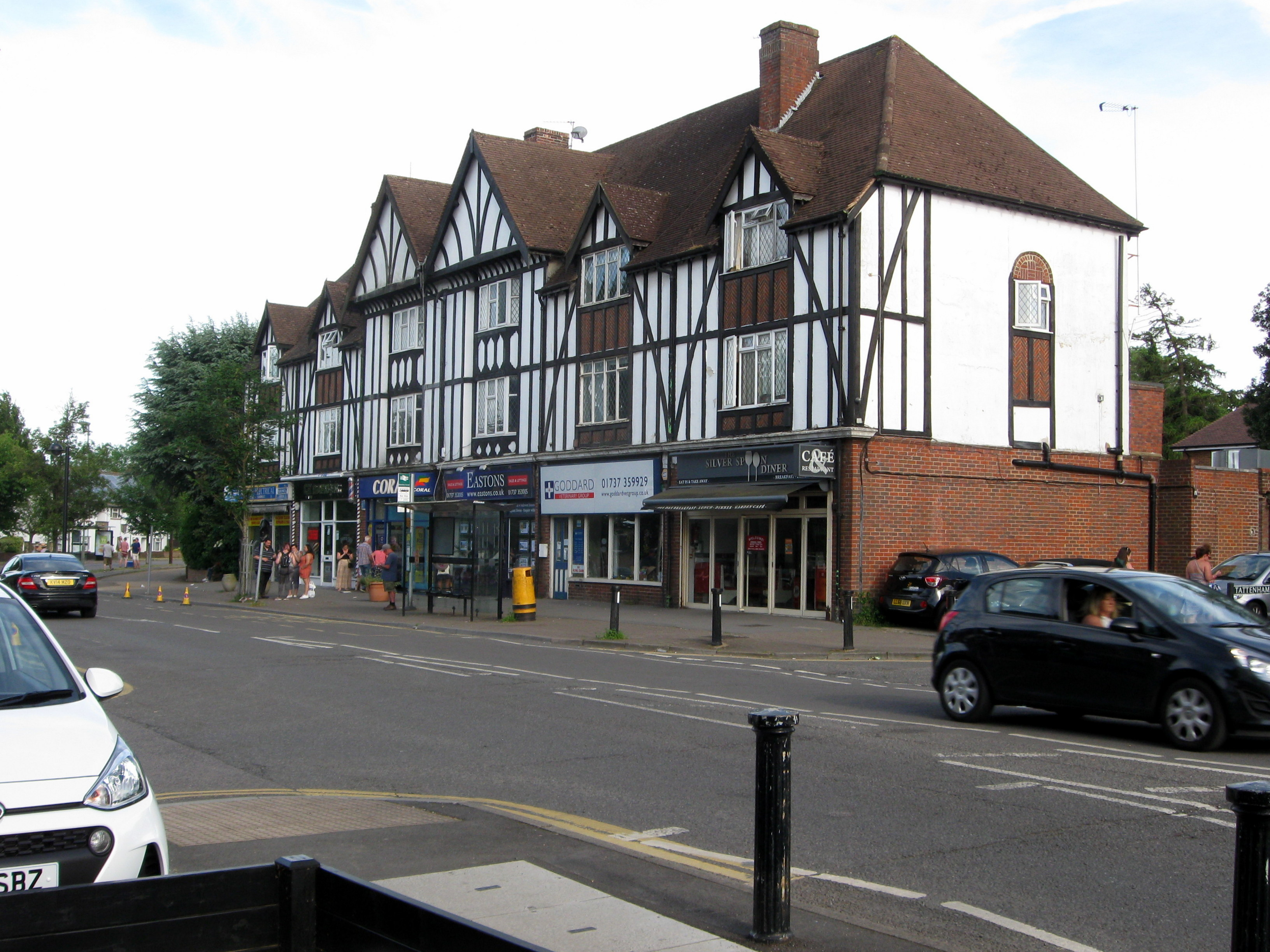
- Shops in Tattenham Crescent

- Location within Surrey
- Area: 2.45 km^{2} (0.95 sq mi)
- Population: 7,274 (2011 census. Ward)
  - Density: 2,969/km^{2} (7,690/sq mi)
- OS grid reference: TQ2557
- Civil parish: n/a
- District: Reigate and Banstead
- Shire county: Surrey
- Region: South East
- Country: England
- Sovereign state: United Kingdom
- Post town: Epsom
- Postcode district: KT18
- Dialling code: 01737
- Police: Surrey
- Fire: Surrey
- Ambulance: South East Coast
- UK Parliament: Reigate

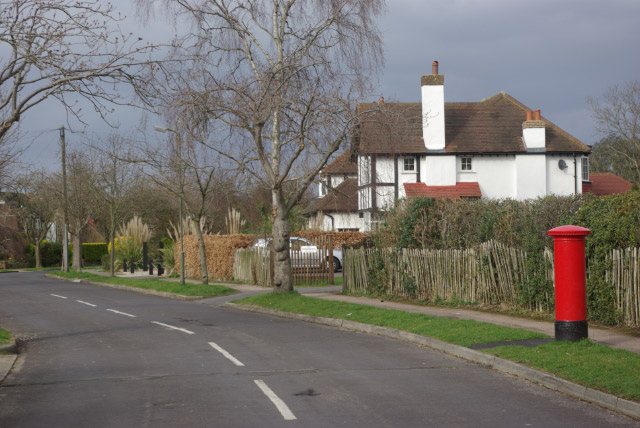

Tattenham Corner is in north Surrey, England, the name is principally associated with Epsom Racecourse. The railway station of the same name is in the Tattenhams ward of Reigate and Banstead Borough.

== Location ==
Tattenham Corner refers to the sharp bend in the track at the eastern (upper) part of Epsom Racecourse. It is about 3 km south-east of Epsom town centre. Nearby are Tattenham Corner railway station and a small group of shops and restaurants. The racecourse itself and a short length of road between the station and the course are in the borough of Epsom & Ewell. The local residential area is in Tattenhams ward of Reigate & Banstead.

== History ==
The area is on the northern slope of the North Downs. It was formerly used largely for cattle pasture, sheep farming and wood gathering. By the 1770s, Tattenham Corner was the established name for the top section of the relatively new Epsom Racecourse on Epsom Downs. Between 1850 and 1950 much of the area was built up. The railways arrived in the area.

=== Emily Davison ===
Newsreel footage of the 1913 Epsom Derby from Pathé News. The events involving Davison occur between 5:51 and 6:15.

On 4 June 1913 Emily Davison obtained two flags bearing the suffragette colours of purple, white and green from the WSPU offices; she then travelled by train to Epsom, Surrey, to attend the Derby. She positioned herself in the infield at Tattenham Corner, the final bend before the home straight. At this point in the race, with some of the horses having passed her, she ducked under the guard rail and ran onto the course; she may have held in her hands one of the suffragette flags. She reached up to the reins of Anmer—King George V's horse, ridden by Herbert Jones—and was hit by the animal, which would have been travelling at around 35 miles (56 km) per hour, four seconds after stepping onto the course. Anmer fell in the collision and partly rolled over his jockey, who had his foot momentarily caught in the stirrup. Davison was knocked to the ground unconscious; some reports say she was kicked in the head by Anmer, but the surgeon who operated on Davison stated that "I could find no trace of her having been kicked by a horse". (Note: Craganour, the bookmakers' favourite, crossed the finishing line first, but a stewards' enquiry led to the horse being placed last and the race being awarded to Aboyeur, a 100/1 outsider.) Bystanders rushed onto the track and attempted to aid Davison and Jones until both were taken to the nearby Epsom Cottage Hospital. Davison was operated on two days later, but she never regained consciousness; while in hospital she received hate mail. (Note: One letter, signed "An Englishman", read "I am glad that you are in hospital. I hope you suffer torture until you die, you idiot. ... I should like the opportunity of starving and beating you to a pulp.") She died on 8 June from a fracture at the base of her skull.

== Topography of Tattenhams ==
Tattenhams is a residential area centered on the road Great Tattenhams (B2221). It largely coincides with the Tattenhams ward of Reigate & Banstead borough. It is bounded to the south by the Preston Estate, to the south-west by Tadworth, to the west by Walton Downs and Epsom Downs, to the north by Nork and to the east by Banstead. Elevations range between 180 m AOD (above sea level) at its south-east corner and 140 m along most of the northern border. The ward also includes, at its east end and some way from Tattenham Corner, a small area known as Great Burgh, which usually refers only to the former manor site there.

Tattenhams has an established Church of England parish.

== Demography and housing: Tattenhams ward ==
2011 Census Homes
Ward	Detached	Semi-detached	Terraced	Flats and apartments	Caravans/temporary/mobile homes/houseboats	Shared between households
Tattenhams	1,006	902	585	630	0	0

The average level of accommodation in the region composed of detached houses was 28%, the average that was apartments was 22.6%.

2011 Census Households
Ward	Population	Households	% Owned outright	% Owned with a loan	Area (hectares)
Tattenhams	7,370	3,123	38	38	245

The proportion of households who owned their home outright compares to the regional average of 35.1%. The proportion who owned their home with a loan compares to the regional average of 32.5%. The remaining % is made up of rented dwellings (plus a negligible % of households living rent-free).

Homes, mostly split between the three main types of houses with gardens, are predominantly of early 20th century origin. The fourth category of homes here, apartments, range in date from the late 20th to the early 21st centuries.

== Transport ==
Tattenham Corner railway station is where Queen Elizabeth II used to be dropped off by the Royal Train on race days, and is closer to the racecourse than Epsom Downs railway station. There are several bus services going through the area, towards Epsom, Sutton or Redhill. In 1993 it was the site of a train crash, where a driver several times over the then legal drink-drive limit failed to stop the train at the buffers, crashing into the station-hut.

== See also ==
- List of places of worship in Reigate and Banstead
- Tattenham Corner branch line

== Bibliography ==
- Colmore, Gertrude (1988) [1913]. "The Life of Emily Davison". In Morley, Ann; Stanley, Liz (eds.). The Life and Death of Emily Wilding Davison. London: The Women's Press. ISBN 978-0-7043-4133-3.
- Purvis, June (2013). "The 1913 Death of Emily Wilding Davison was a Key Moment in the Ongoing Struggle for Gender Equality in the UK". Democratic Audit. Archived from the original on 11 October 2017.
- Morley, Ann; Stanley, Liz (1988). The Life and Death of Emily Wilding Davison. London: The Women's Press. ISBN 978-0-7043-4133-3.
- Tanner, Michael (2013). The Suffragette Derby. London: The Robson Press. ISBN 978-1-8495-4518-1.
