= A217 road =

Road in England

Coordinates: 51.35116°N 0.20833°W

A217

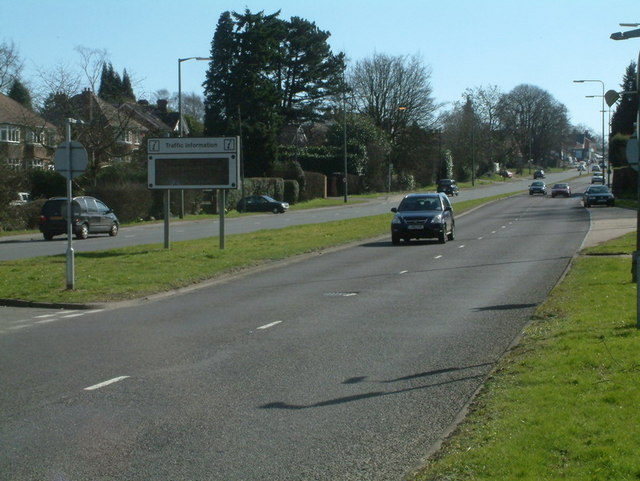
- The A217 running through Lower Kingswood

Major junctions
- North end: Fulham
- A308 A3205 A214; A3; A24 A216 A236 A239 A297 A232 A2022 A240 M25; A25 A2044; A23
- South end: Gatwick

Location
- Country: United Kingdom
- Primary destinations: Sutton, Reigate

Road network
- Roads in the United Kingdom; Motorways; A and B road zones

The A217 is a road in London and Surrey in England, running north–south from Kings Road in Fulham, London to a road at Gatwick Airport's northern perimeter.

== Route ==
=== Fulham to Tooting ===
The A217 starts as a non-primary A-road named Wandsworth Bridge Road, Fulham in the London Borough of Hammersmith & Fulham and runs for 0.8 miles (1.3 km) before crossing over the River Thames at Wandsworth Bridge. The road enters the town and London borough of Wandsworth. The road turns right at a roundabout on to Swandon Way, becoming a primary route for a short stretch (as a continuation of the A3205), before passing Wandsworth Town railway station. It is briefly called Fairfield St before meeting the A3 (Wandsworth High St.).

The road reverts to non-primary status, and changes name to Garratt Lane, passing Southside shopping centre, before it heads out of Wandsworth and into Earlsfield. It passes the B234 shortly before reaching Earlsfield railway station. It continues through Summerstown as Garratt Lane and the road passes the B229 (Burntwood Lane) before it reaches Streatham Cemetery.

In Lower Tooting, it meets Tooting Broadway, a busy junction with the A24 and tube station, before becoming Mitcham Road and passing the B241 (Rectory Lane). It passes Tooting railway station and this is where the road exits the London Borough of Wandsworth.

=== Mitcham to Belmont ===
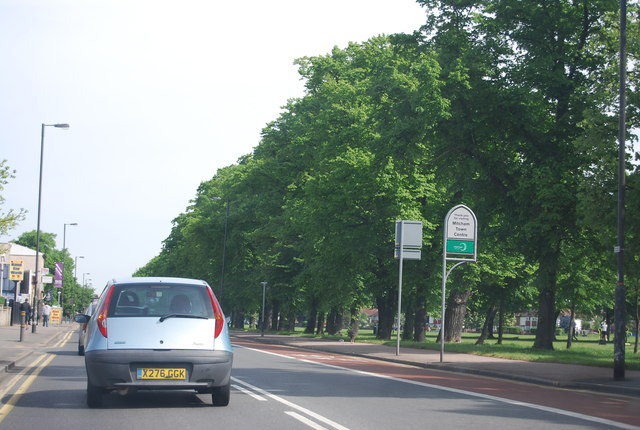
The A217, passing Figges Marsh in Mitcham

It becomes London Road as it enters the London Borough of Merton. It continues through the one-way system at Mitcham and passes Mitcham tram station before becoming Bishopsford Road.

The road enters the St Helier Estate, firstly in the Morden area before the Carshalton part in the London Borough of Sutton. The road reaches Rosehill, which contains a busy 6-way roundabout, before becoming a primary class A-road as it becomes Reigate Avenue (effectively the Sutton by-pass.) As the Sutton by-pass, the road passes the B279 (Sutton Common Road) and Sutton Common area, which changes name to Oldfields Road and passes the Tesco superstore in the Kimpton Park commercial and industrial area on the edge of Sutton Common. It passes a crossroads with Gander Green Lane and becomes St Dunstans Hill before reaching a junction in Cheam with the A232 (High St and Ewell Road). It becomes Belmont Rise and goes past a crossroads with Northey Avenue and the road leaves the suburban area of Belmont, as well as Greater London.

==== Bishopsford Road Bridge ====
===== Details =====
The A217 crosses the River Wandle in Mitcham on Bishopsford Road Bridge, also known as Mitcham Bridge.

===== Flood and collapse =====
On 10 June 2019, unusually high river waters began while the bridge was being surfaced. Jack posts had been placed underneath to support the vehicles and machinery. These trapped debris (branches, weeds etc.) for four days.

The pent-up head of water surged through causing Bridge scour (eroding) up to 4 m (13 ft) deep and undermined the bridge footings. This led to the partial collapse of the northern arch on 14 June 2019. The southern arch was unaffected and the central arch suffered minor structural damage. Due to the collapse, the road is anticipated to reopen by the onset of Summer 2021.

The Borough Council's repair work involved FM Conway and the Environment Agency. They have stabilised the bridge, pre-inspection and repair. Crack-injection and underpinning has secured the central arch. Bed scouring to the west has been filled with stone and gravel; that under the north arch, with marine concrete.

Works halted for insurance investigators to inspect for evidence of liability.

=== Banstead to Lower Kingswood ===
At the road enters Surrey, it meets the B2230 again at a roundabout to the south of Belmont before entering the notorious 'Mad Mile' section (Brighton Road).

For the next 5 miles, the road has an unbroken chain of average speed cameras, all of which the speed limit is 40 mph. In this area the road passes Banstead Downs, and its golf course. After passing the Banstead Crossroads, it acts as a boundary between Nork and Banstead as it heads towards Burgh Heath, passing the junctions with Garratts Lane (B2219) and Tattenham Way (B2221) before reaching the A240 (Reigate Road) at the centre of Burgh Heath.

It passes near the large suburban villages of Tadworth and Kingswood, passing several B-roads, including the B2032. It travels beside Banstead Heath (still as Brighton Road) before reaching the small settlement of Lower Kingswood. After passing a roundabout near Kingswood Manor, the road arrives at the Reigate Hill Interchange, which is also Junction 8 of the M25.

=== Reigate to Horley ===
At this point, the A217 becomes a non-primary A-road. It is now named Reigate Hill, in a very steep section of the North Downs. The area become more urban at the bottom of the hill, on the northern outskirts of the town of Reigate. It passes through a level crossing next to Reigate station. It runs concurrently with the A25 through the main one-way system of Reigate town centre. It carries on through the localities of Woodhatch and Doversgreen before going into a very rural area. It travels over the River Mole in the small hamlet of Sidlow. After a period of farms, the road passes the village of Hookwood, taking a left turn at a roundabout. Continuing past Povey Cross, the road reaches Longbridge Roundabout on the border with West Sussex.

== Landmarks on the route ==
- Wandsworth Bridge
- The converted Young's Brewery
- South Thames College and Southside Wandsworth
- Earlsfield railway station
- Tooting Broadway tube station
- Tooting railway station
- Figges Marsh (Park), Tooting
- Mitcham Cricket Green
- Mitcham tram stop and Station House
- Rosehill Recreation Ground
- Banstead Downs
- Banstead Heath
- Reigate College, Town Hall and castle ruins/tunnel
- Sidlow Bridge over the River Mole, Surrey
- Holiday Inn Gatwick/Longbridge Roundabout/Best Western Gatwick Moat House

== Illegal racing at Banstead ==
The stretch of the A217 nicknamed The Mad Mile has been a focal point of illegal street racing since the mid-20th century. It is a straight length of dual carriageway which runs downhill from the Banstead crossroads with the A2022 to the roundabout with the B2230 near Belmont.

The road's notoriety developed shortly after World War II due to the increasing affordability and popularity of motorbikes and cars. During the early 1980s, bikers illegally marked out "starting grids" at either end of the Mile on more than one occasion, which were later scrubbed out by the local authority; this activity restarted in the early 2000s among wayward modified car enthusiasts, whose races would often take place on Thursday nights. Information regarding races spread quickly through increasing use of the Internet and some participants and spectators travelled to races from as far away as Birmingham. Police presence gradually diffused this illegal activity, but it has not completely disappeared. Measures to stop these races include barriers erected on the centre grass verge which runs the length of this stretch, where people used to park to watch illegal road use.

=== Fatal incidents ===
In August 2006 two men illegally racing along this stretch of a public highway caused an accident that killed three people, a separate offence, and were sentenced to imprisonment for a term of years. Aggravating the offence committed, the conviction found from the evidence in the case that the two men were driving recklessly at a speed much faster than the 40 miles per hour (64 km/h) limit on the road at the point of the accident.
