= Burgh Heath =

Village and parish in Surrey, England

Coordinates: 51.305°N 0.220°W

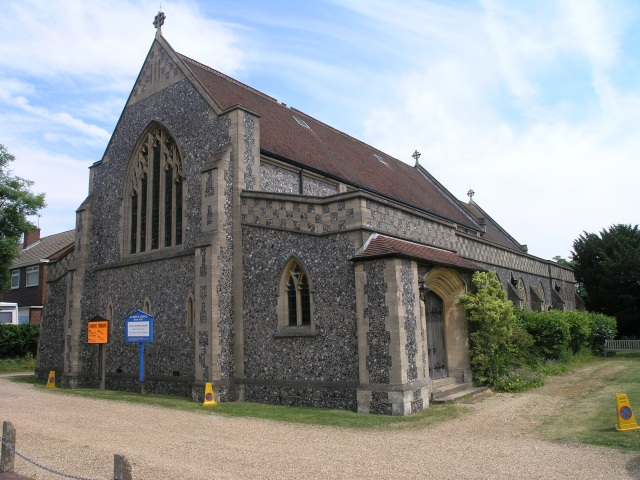
- St Mary's parish church

- Location within Surrey
- Population: 1,884 (2011 Census)
- OS grid reference: TQ242580
- District: Reigate and Banstead
- Shire county: Surrey
- Region: South East
- Country: England
- Sovereign state: United Kingdom
- Post town: Tadworth
- Postcode district: KT20
- Dialling code: 01737
- Police: Surrey
- Fire: Surrey
- Ambulance: South East Coast
- UK Parliament: Reigate

Burgh Heath (/ˌbɜːr ˈhiːθ/ bur HEETH or, especially amongst older residents, /ˌbʌrə ˈhiːθ/ BURR-ə HEETH) is a residential neighbourhood with a remnant part of the Banstead Commons of the same name. Immediately north of Upper Kingswood on the A217 road, it adjoins part of Banstead to the north. The north of the area is more specifically called Great Burgh, but the terms are largely interchangeable.

== History ==
Burgh or Great Burgh was a manor of Banstead with an Old English name, it saw very little expansion before the end of the 19th century being on land which was part of the large, and water-scarce Banstead Heath or Common on the North Downs. It developed into a village-like hamlet in the early part of the 20th century.

The Domesday Book records a church at Burgh, connected with its manor held by Odo, Earl of Kent. Rectors were instituted to it in the 14th and 15th centuries, but there is no evidence of its having been a separate parish from Banstead after 1414, in the latter's many governmental and ecclesiastical patent, enquiry and taxation rolls. Bergh or Burgh Church was between Little Burgh House and Church Lane, where the foundations remained supporting a barn until about 1880.

The present Church of England parish church of Saint Mary is a Gothic revival building completed in 1909.

A pump-station was built in 1943 at Burgh Heath on the fuel pipeline running from the Thames to Dungeness. It was declared surplus to requirements in 1973 and was later sold and demolished.

== Geography ==
Burgh Heath is a residential settlement centred on a remnant part of the Banstead Commons of the same name on upper slopes of the North Downs. Adjoining are Nork a neighbourhood of the village Banstead which has that village's train station, directly north and Upper Kingswood to the south. The dual carriageway has meant that today there are two separate areas of housing: a larger part with shops on the main road and surrounding Canons Lane to the east and the other to the west close to the ponds, facing Burgh Heath and to distinguish it from the built up sections, known to its residents as "The Green". The 2011 Census recorded Burgh Heath's population as 1,884 people living in 843 households. Burgh Heath has a large Asda superstore which opened in 1988, a luxury sports car garage and Toyota's UK headquarters are in the north of the area at Great Burgh. There is a parade of shops along the A217 of small independent retailers and several small restaurants. However, the majority of residents in the area are commuters out of the area.

=== Open areas of Burgh Heath ===
The residential area is bordered to the south by the Burgh Heath itself, one of four parts of Banstead Commons, managed by the Banstead Commons Conservators and its byelaws. It is bordered east and north by farmland leading to Banstead Woods, managed by local authority Reigate and Banstead Borough Council.

Beside the supermarket is a triangular wood in part of which is Burgh Heath BMX Track.

== Sources ==
- Malden, HE, ed. (1911). "Banstead". A History of the County of Surrey. Victoria County History. Vol. III. Westminster: Archibald Constable. pp. 252–262.
- Nairn, Ian; Pevsner, Nikolaus; Cherry, Bridget (revision) (1971) [1962]. Surrey. The Buildings of England (2nd ed.). Harmondsworth: Penguin Books. p. 121. ISBN 0-14-071021-3.
