= The Beacon School, Banstead =

The Beacon School

Location
- Picquets Way; Banstead, Surrey, SM7 1AG; England; 51.315214°N 0.215144°W

Information
- Type: Academy
- Established: 1936
- Local authority: Surrey County Council
- Department for Education URN: 137735 Tables
- Ofsted: Reports
- Headteacher: James Grant Duff
- Staff: 180 (approx)
- Gender: Mixed
- Age: 11 to 18
- Enrolment: 1216 as of September 2015
- Colours: Navy Blue, Green, Purple, Blue, Red
- Website: www.thebeaconschool.co.uk

The Beacon School, previously Nork Park School, previously Picquet’s Way School, is a mixed academy school in Banstead, Surrey. The school's values are excellence and respect. The school is a member of the GLF trust.

The 2023 Ofsted rating was 'Requires Improvement'. The school's most recent Ofsted inspection in 2026 rated it as 'Expected Standard' in five areas, with one area rated as 'Needs Attention'.
