= Banstead =

Town in Surrey, England

Coordinates: 51.322°N 0.204°W

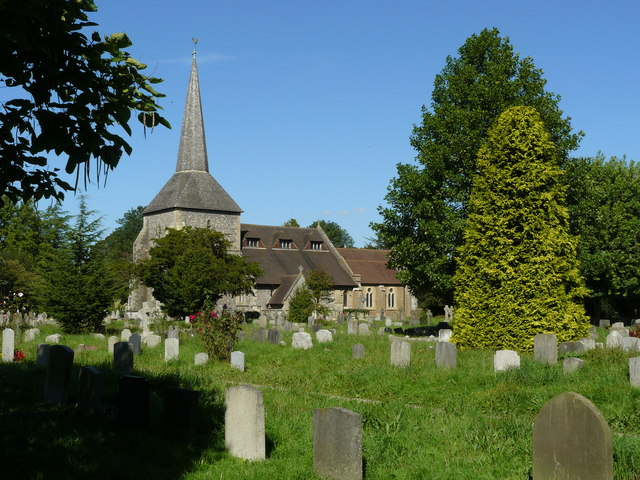
- All Saints' Church, Banstead

- Location within Surrey
- Area: 8.25 km^{2} (3.19 sq mi)
- Population: 16,666 (2011 census)
  - Density: 2,020/km^{2} (5,200/sq mi)
- OS grid reference: TQ2560
  - London: 13.3 mi (21.4 km) N by NE
- District: Reigate and Banstead
- Shire county: Surrey
- Region: South East
- Country: England
- Sovereign state: United Kingdom
- Post town: BANSTEAD
- Postcode district: SM7
- Dialling code: 01737
- Police: Surrey
- Fire: Surrey
- Ambulance: South East Coast
- UK Parliament: Reigate

Banstead is a town in the borough of Reigate and Banstead in Surrey, England. It is 3 miles (5 km) south of Sutton, 7 miles (11 km) south-west of Croydon, 7 miles (11 km) north of Reigate, 8.5 miles (14 km) south-east of Kingston-upon-Thames, and 14 miles (23 km) south of Central London.

On the North Downs, it is on three of the four main compass points separated from other settlements by open area buffers with Metropolitan Green Belt status. Banstead Downs, although a fragment of its larger historic area and spread between newer developments, is a Site of Special Scientific Interest (SSSI).

One of the Banstead wards is "Banstead Village". The contiguous ward of Nork, which contains Banstead station, shares in many amenities of Banstead and is included in county-level population analyses of Banstead but not the central-government-drawn Banstead Built-up Area. The latter takes in Burgh Heath and held 15,469 residents as at the 2011 census.

== History ==
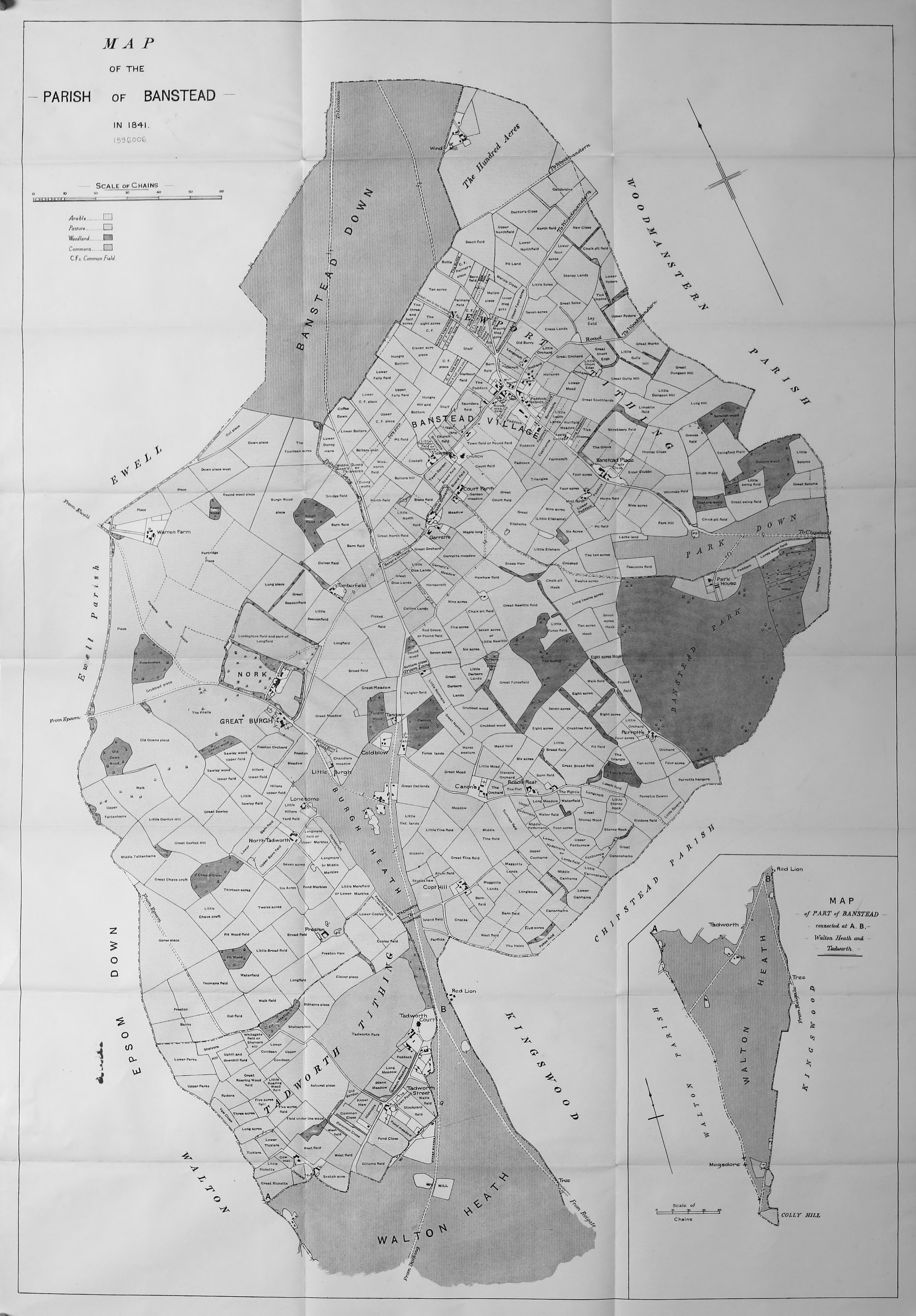
Banstead in 1841, based on a tithe map. Many modern street names derive from those of features named here.

The earliest recorded mention of Banstead was in an Anglo-Saxon charter of AD 967, in the reign of King Edgar.

The settlement appears in the Domesday Book of 1086 as Benestede. The first element is probably the Anglo Saxon word bene, meaning bean, and the second element stede refers to an inhabited place without town status (as in farmstead).

Banstead's non-ecclesiastical land and 50 households were held by Richard as tenant-in-chief, under the Bishop of Bayeux. Its assets were: 9½ hides, 1 church, 1 mill worth £1, 17 ploughs, woodland worth 20 hogs. It rendered £8 per year.

The Manor had two ploughs, and there were 28 villeins and 15 cottars (people with a small cottage but no land) with 15 ploughs.

This was a farming area that later became well known for its high quality wool. The manor was owned by increasingly wealthy gentry, then by the church, before it fell into the hands of the Crown in the 13th century; Edward I visited more than once. Henry VIII made Banstead part of Catherine of Aragon's dowry, but took it away again and gave it to a court favourite, Sir Nicholas Carew. Carew was later beheaded for treason, but the manor, once covering most of the village but mostly sold piecemeal, stayed in his family until the 18th century.

Banstead Downs, which for many centuries meant all the open land stretching from Epsom to Croydon and Reigate, became well known for horse racing in the 17th century. On 20 November 1683, King Charles II and the Duke of York attended a race meeting near the core of the village. The town also gained a reputation as a health resort during that era, famous for its "wholesome air", and London physicians recommended a visit to Banstead to their ailing patients.

Banstead's population remained low until the late 19th century when the improved roads and the building of the railways led to gradual growth, which continued with low density social housing and post-Blitz rehousing projects in the mid 20th century. Banstead's housing stock is generally low density and set in overwhelmingly green surroundings; there are a few listed buildings of some historical and architectural interest. Banstead was a spring line settlement whose main source of water was The Old Well until the arrival of pumped water. The 18th-century well-head cover, which still houses the elaborate winding gear, is a listed building.

In 1930, the ecclesiastical parish of Nork was formed, taking in part of Epsom as far as Wallace Fields and Higher Green in the west of the parish, loosely termed Epsom Downs.

== Governance ==
There are two tiers of local government covering Banstead, at district and county level, being Reigate and Banstead Borough Council and Surrey County Council, both of which are based in Reigate. There are no civil parishes covering Banstead, which has been an unparished area since 1974.

=== Administrative history ===
Banstead was an ancient parish. The parish was included in the Epsom Poor Law Union from 1836, and therefore became part of the Epsom Rural Sanitary District in 1872. When elected parish and district councils were established in 1894, Banstead was given a parish council and the Epsom Rural Sanitary District became the Epsom Rural District.

In 1933 the Epsom Rural District was abolished, and a new Banstead Urban District was created, covering the parishes of Banstead, Chipstead, Kingswood, Walton-on-the-Hill, and Woodmansterne. The parish councils in the area were all abolished at the same time; as urban parishes the new urban district council was their lowest level of local government. Later in 1933 the urban district council bought a large Victorian house called The Lodge at the corner of Brighton Road and Chipstead Road and converted it to become their headquarters, renaming it the Council House.

Banstead Urban District was abolished in 1974 under the Local Government Act 1972, becoming part of the new borough of Reigate and Banstead. The civil parishes within the former urban district, including Banstead, were abolished at the same time, although they had had no practical functions since 1933. The former Banstead Urban District Council's headquarters at the Council House served as additional offices for the new Reigate and Banstead Council for some years, before being mostly demolished in 2002 and rebuilt as flats called Holmewood House. The frontage of the original building was incorporated into the new building, with the old part now being a locally-listed building.

== Demography ==
At the 2011 census the population of Banstead (including Nork) was 16,666. The population of Banstead Village ward was 8,510 in 2001 and 9,110 in 2011. Banstead Parish now only exists for church purposes, there being no civil parish as it was abolished in 1974. Due to the aridity of the surface of the higher south, the old parish stretched far and wide to take in the width of the widest section of the North Downs and still today Banstead is drawn more widely than its narrow village or county or borough electoral wards and divisions under three measures:

- As a post town
- As Banstead Downs
- As accounting for the main northern settlement or 'Banstead part' of the borough of Reigate and Banstead.

Taking the last, broadest definition, in 2001, the upland settlements loosely associated with Banstead such as Tadworth had some 46,280 people across an area of approximately 16 square miles (41 km^{2}) (four miles by four miles).

The ward of Nork includes areas which were not historically part of the hamlet of Nork. At the 2011 Census it had 7,556 residents.

The area historically had many other hamlets, which gradually gained their own village or town status; they stretched as far as Reigate across the widest part of crest of the North Downs. Thus, historic demography does not give a fair indicator of population change. (Note: The hamlets mostly in Banstead in various southward directions of the village centre were for centuries: Kingswood with Burgh Heath; Nork; Preston; Margery; Mogador and Tadworth; and Tattenhams) (Note: In 1848, Banstead consisted of some 5,463 acres (2,211 ha), chiefly in pasture: 1,375 acres (556 ha) were common or waste) Identifying this swathe of land in 21st century figures with the parish, historical population growth is as follows, with parts of Walton-on-the-Hill and Chipstead included in the 2001 and 2011 wards:

Population of Banstead Ancient and/or Civil Parish
Year	1801	1811	1821	1831	1841	1851	1881	1891
Population	717	882	940	991	1628	1270	3826	4560
Year	1901	1911	1921	1931	1941	1951	2001	2011
Population	5,624	6,731	7,337	11,236	n/a	22,399	41,559	46,280

2011 Census Homes
Ward	Detached	Semi-detached	Terraced	Flats and apartments	Caravans/temporary/mobile homes/houseboats	Shared between households
Banstead (ward)	922	1,128	365	934	0	0
Nork (ward)	1,612	808	162	303	1	1

The average level of accommodation in the region composed of detached houses was 28%, the average that was apartments was 22.6%.

2011 Census Households
Ward	Population	Households	% Owned outright	% Owned with a loan	hectares
Banstead (ward)	9,110	3,349	43	39	462
Nork (ward)	7,556	2,888	43	45	363

The proportion of households who owned their home outright compares to the regional average of 35.1%. The proportion who owned their home with a loan compares to the regional average of 32.5%. The remaining % is made up of rented dwellings (plus a negligible % of households living rent-free).

== Economy ==
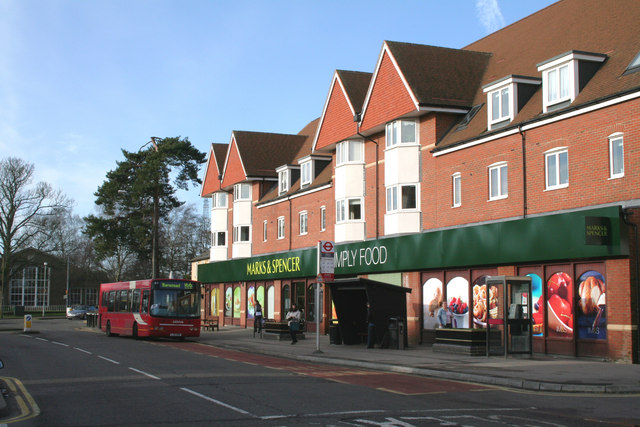
Banstead High Street

The centre of Banstead has a High Street from its war memorial to its public library. A churchyard occupies part of the south side. Local Scouts and Guides parade the street on Remembrance Day and May Day. In December 2008 a fire destroyed the Waitrose supermarket. While being rebuilt, Waitrose opened a temporary store in the former Woolworths. The rebuilt store opened in November 2009. There are various restaurants and coffee bars as well as largely upmarket independent stores and the professional offices: six estate agencies, three firms of solicitors and a notary public.

Other than High Street jobs the large village has some in the public sector: in council offices and NHS facilities to the west of the Banstead's centre, and in various local schools. Self-employed such as contracting engineers and domestic tradespeople make up some of the labour force but most of Banstead's residents commute out of the district for employment: annual exits from the town's station rose from 93,069 in the tax year 2004–05 to 128,148 in 2011–12.

== Religion ==
Banstead has several churches. All Saints' Church and Christ Church Banstead are on the high street. Within the area there is also Banstead Community Church, St Anne's Roman Catholic Church, the Methodist Church, St Paul's Church, the United Reformed Church and Crown Family Church that meets at the Banstead Community Centre.

== Education ==
There are several schools in and around Banstead. Further education is not available in the town, most students go to institutions in Sutton, Epsom or Reigate.

=== Primary ===
- St Anne's Catholic Primary School (for ages 4 to 11)
- Banstead Infants School / Banstead Juniors School
- Warren Mead Primary School, Nork

=== Secondary ===
- The Beacon School, previously Nork Park Secondary School, is the predominant secondary comprehensive school in the area. Nork Park, a public park, borders the back of the school. It is one of the 23 schools that supply ball boys to the Wimbledon Tennis Championships. It has over 1000 students.

The neighbouring London Borough of Sutton has five grammar schools, which accept pupils from outside the borough.

=== Independent ===
- Aberdour School (co-educational preparatory school for ages 3 to 13)
- Banstead Preparatory School (co-educational preparatory school for ages 2 to 11)
- Priory Preparatory School and Greenacre School for girls both closed in 2017 and formed the Banstead Preparatory School.

== Transport ==
- The majority of the town is bypassed by the A217 dual carriageway to the west. The A2022 passes through the residential area just to the north of the town centre, however the town centre frequently suffers from traffic congestion.
- There are several bus services through the village, linking to Epsom, Sutton and Croydon, which all have good onward bus and rail connections.
- Banstead railway station is to the west of the town's centre, across the A217. It is within Nork ward rather than Banstead ward.

== Media ==
With its close proximity to London, television signals are received from the Crystal Palace TV transmitter, placing Banstead in the BBC London and ITV London areas.

The town is served by both BBC Radio Surrey and BBC Radio London. Other radio stations including Heart South, Capital Xtra, Greatest Hits Radio London, Greatest Hits Radio Surrey & East Hampshire, and SUSY Radio, a community based station which broadcast from Redhill.

The Surrey Mirror is the local newspaper that covers the town.

== Elevation and soil ==
Much of the land is at about 125 m above sea level and this descends to about 100 m. It is bisected by a railway line in a relatively deep cutting.

Underneath a variable depth humus topsoil, most of the village is on various flints or chalk.

== Landmarks ==
Church

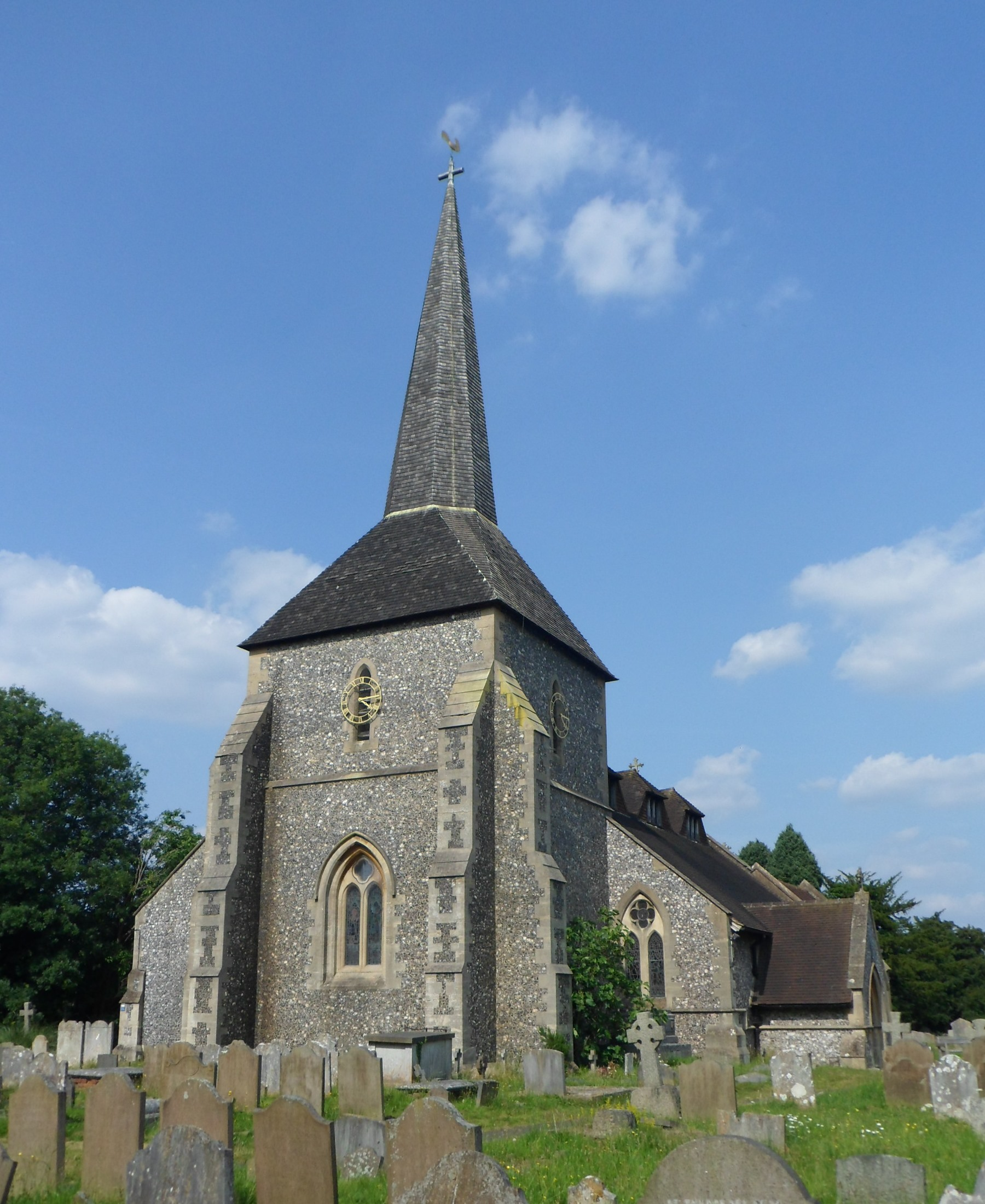
All Saints' Church, Banstead

The Anglican parish church of All Saints, made of knapped flint, partially dressed in stone, with sturdy tower and medieval spire, was built in the 12th and 13th centuries. It was restored to the specifications of architect G. E. Street in 1861. The west window was designed by Dante Gabriel Rossetti and produced by William Morris's workshop.

Records survive showing the site of the church was donated by Nigel de Mowbray, Lord of the manor.

The spire was a guiding marker for the first proper, scientific, mapping baseline made in Great Britain. This was for the Anglo-French Survey (1784–1790) which sought to measure the exact distance and direction between the Royal Observatory, Greenwich and the Paris Observatory. As a result precisely scaled mapping of the country was enabled, led by General William Roy. Several hundreds of yards NNE, a spur of slightly lower upland, Hundred Acres, likely marked with a tower or post, was used to make sightings north to Hanger Hill Tower, south-east to Botley Hill, east to Upper Norwood, and west to St Ann's Hill, the first and later triangulation points.

Well

The old village well stands to the east of the town centre in Woodmansterne Lane. It is almost 300 feet (91 m) deep and was last used around the end of the 19th century. The wellhead cover dates from the 18th century and holds old winding gear.

Nork Park

Nork Park contains the remains of the Colman family mansion (associated with Colman's Mustard).

Tumble Beacon

A large mound off The Drive, close to the Beacon School, is known as the Tumble Beacon. Originally a Bronze Age bowl barrow, it was enlarged circa the sixteenth century, and is believed to have been the site of one of a series of beacons/bonfires that stretched from the south coast towards London warning of the arrival of the Spanish Armada.

=== Demolished ===
On the site of Downview and Highdown Prisons by the end of the 19th century stood one of the London County Lunatic Asylums, Banstead Asylum, a psychiatric hospital from 1873 to 1986. After being sent by panel to treatment there in the late 1960s, singer-songwriter Vincent Crane wrote the song "Banstead," which featured on the 1970 album sharing his band's name Atomic Roooster. In the 1890s the asylum had two small lodges, a small hospital, a cemetery and a coal-gas works.

== Open space ==
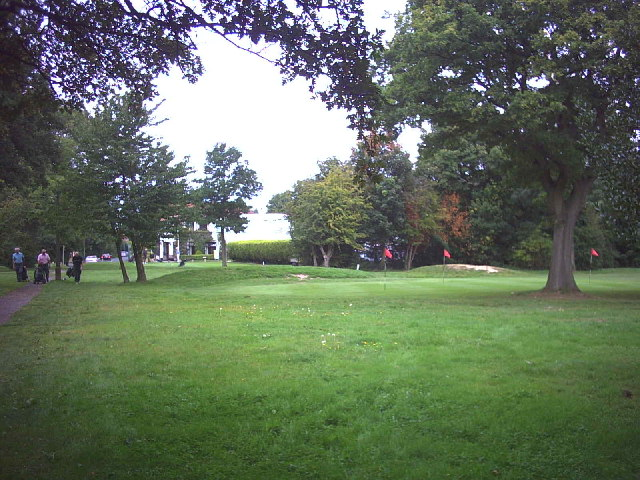
Banstead Downs golf course

Banstead Downs is a large Site of Special Scientific Interest, covering 430 acres (170 ha). Banstead Golf Course is on the northern slopes. The Downs is one of four green areas in the north of the borough, which are overall referred to by their historic name "Banstead Commons"; the other three are:

- Burgh Heath: 87 acres (35 ha)
- Banstead Heath: 760 acres (310 ha)
- Park Downs: 74 acres (30 ha) .

Banstead Downs is home to the rare Small Blue butterfly. The four tumuli (burial mounds) that can be seen on the Downs have been identified as dating from Saxon times and are known as the Gally Hills because they are the site of a 15th-century gallows.

== Sport and recreation ==
Banstead Athletic F.C play home games in Tadworth, near the town.

Banstead Cricket Club have played at Avenue Road since its formation in 1842 making it one of the ten oldest in the county.

The Lady Neville Recreation Ground is on Avenue Road. It is named after the wife of Sir Ralph Neville a local High Court judge who bought the land in 1895 when for sale as building plots. The couple's daughter, Edith gifted the land to the civil parish as such in 1925.

== In literature ==
Banstead appears as a destination in the 1895 novel The Time Machine by H. G. Wells and also gains a brief mention in another of his novels, The War of the Worlds.

== Notable residents ==
- Clemence Margaret Acland (1889–1973), nature photographer, ornithologist and researcher
- Lionel Blair, actor, tap dancer, TV presenter
- Gordon Browne, 19th–20th-century artist and prolific illustrator of children's books, son of Hablot Knight Browne; born in Banstead
- Hablot Knight Browne, better known as Phiz, illustrator who worked with Charles Dickens; lived for a time at Garratts Hall, Banstead
- Venetia Burney, who gave the minor planet Pluto its name
- Thomas Colman Dibdin, 19th-century watercolour artist
- Dickson Etuhu, footballer
- Hilda Fearon, early 20th-century artist of the St Ives School
- Andrew Garfield, actor
- Jonathan Greening, footballer
- Lucy Mair, 20th-century anthropologist, daughter of Janet Philip; born in Banstead
- Joseph Marcell, actor
- Derek McCulloch, BBC radio producer and presenter; "Uncle Mac" on Children's Hour and the voice of Larry the Lamb
- Janet Philip, known as Jessy Mair while living in Banstead, later as Janet Beveridge, wife of Sir William Beveridge; produced and promoted his famous report
- Chris Powell, footballer
- Arthur Tedder, Marshal of the Royal Air Force, Deputy Supreme Commander SHAEF
- John Lightfoot Trollope, WW1 flying ace
- Sarah Tullamore, actor, singer and dancer, grew up in Banstead
- Tim Vine, comedian
- Annie Walke, early 20th-century artist of the Newlyn School
- David Walliams, actor and comedian

== See also ==
- Banstead railway station
- Nork
- Banstead Prisoner-of-War Camp

== Notes and references ==
Notes
