= Epsom Downs =

Area of chalk upland in Surrey, England

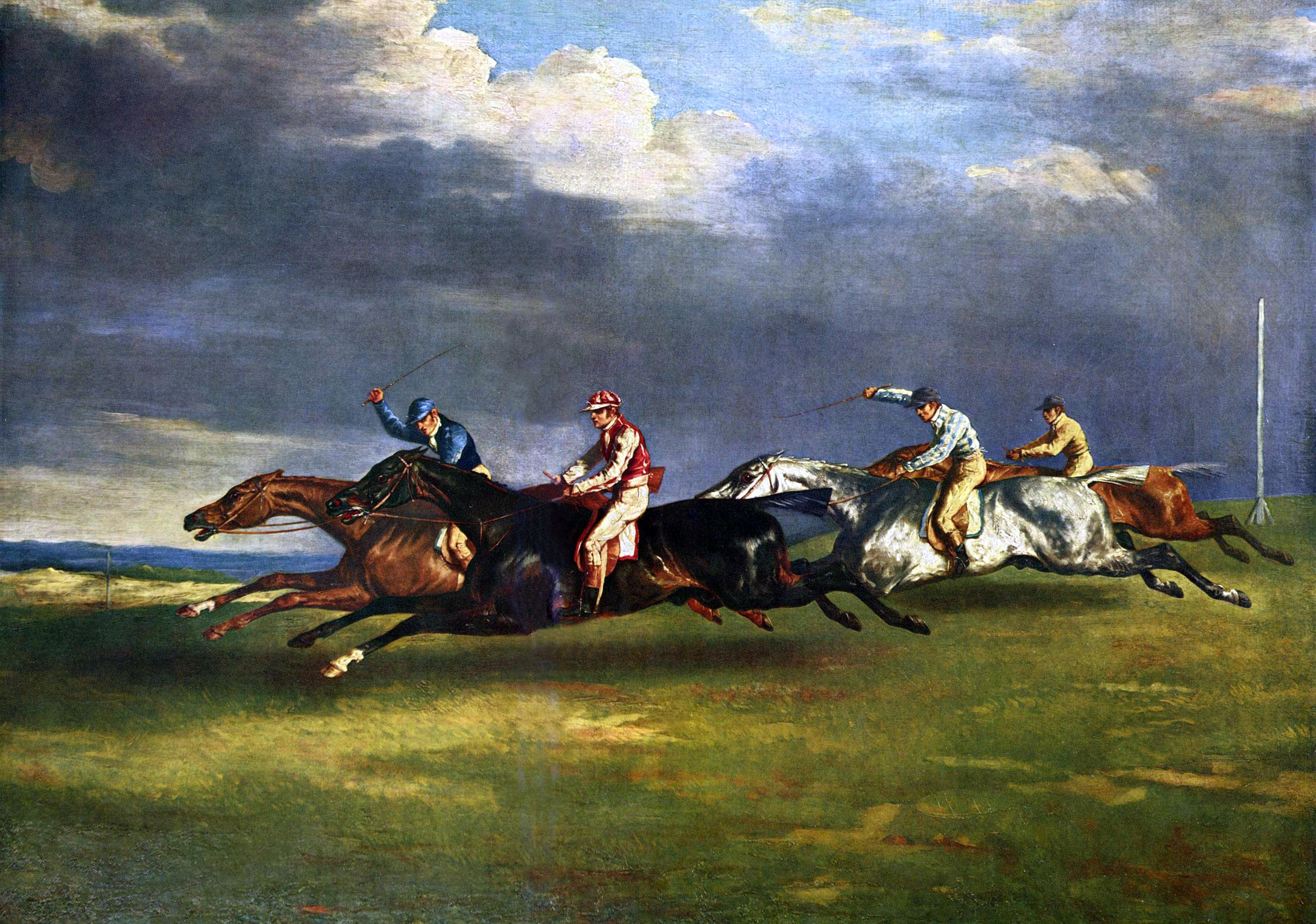
The Epsom Derby is an annual horse racing event held on the Epsom Downs

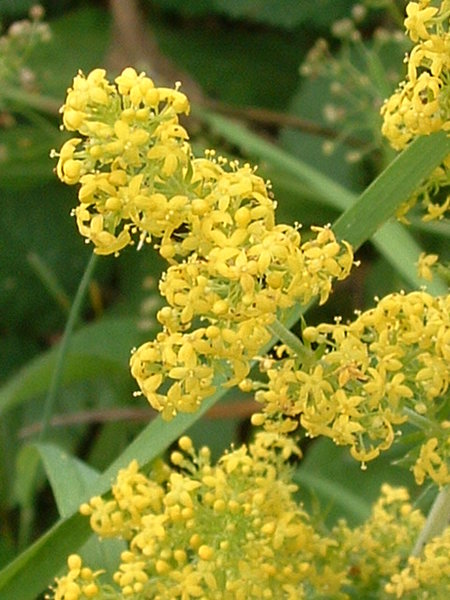
Galium verum (L.) Lady's Bedstraw, a typical English chalk downland plant

Epsom Downs is an area of chalk upland near Epsom, Surrey; in the North Downs. Part of the area is taken up by the racecourse; the gallops are part of the land purchased by Stanly Wootton in 1925 and are open to users such as ramblers, model aircraft flyers, golfers and cyclists. Since January 2006 model aircraft flyers on the Downs have been required to be members of the Epsom Downs Model Aircraft Club. There are over 20 km of routeways for hack riders. There are bylaws for the use of the Downs. There are panoramic views of London to the north from the Downs. The area is served by Epsom Downs and Tattenham Corner railway stations.

== Conservators ==
Epsom Downs is managed by the Epsom and Walton Downs Conservators, which consists of six borough councillors, three representatives of the Epsom Downs Racecourse and one from the racehorse trainers. They are responsible for the maintenance and control of the Downs and the cost of this is split in the same proportion as the representation. The conservators were set up in 1984 to give a voice to the users of the Downs.
