= List of places of worship in Reigate and Banstead =

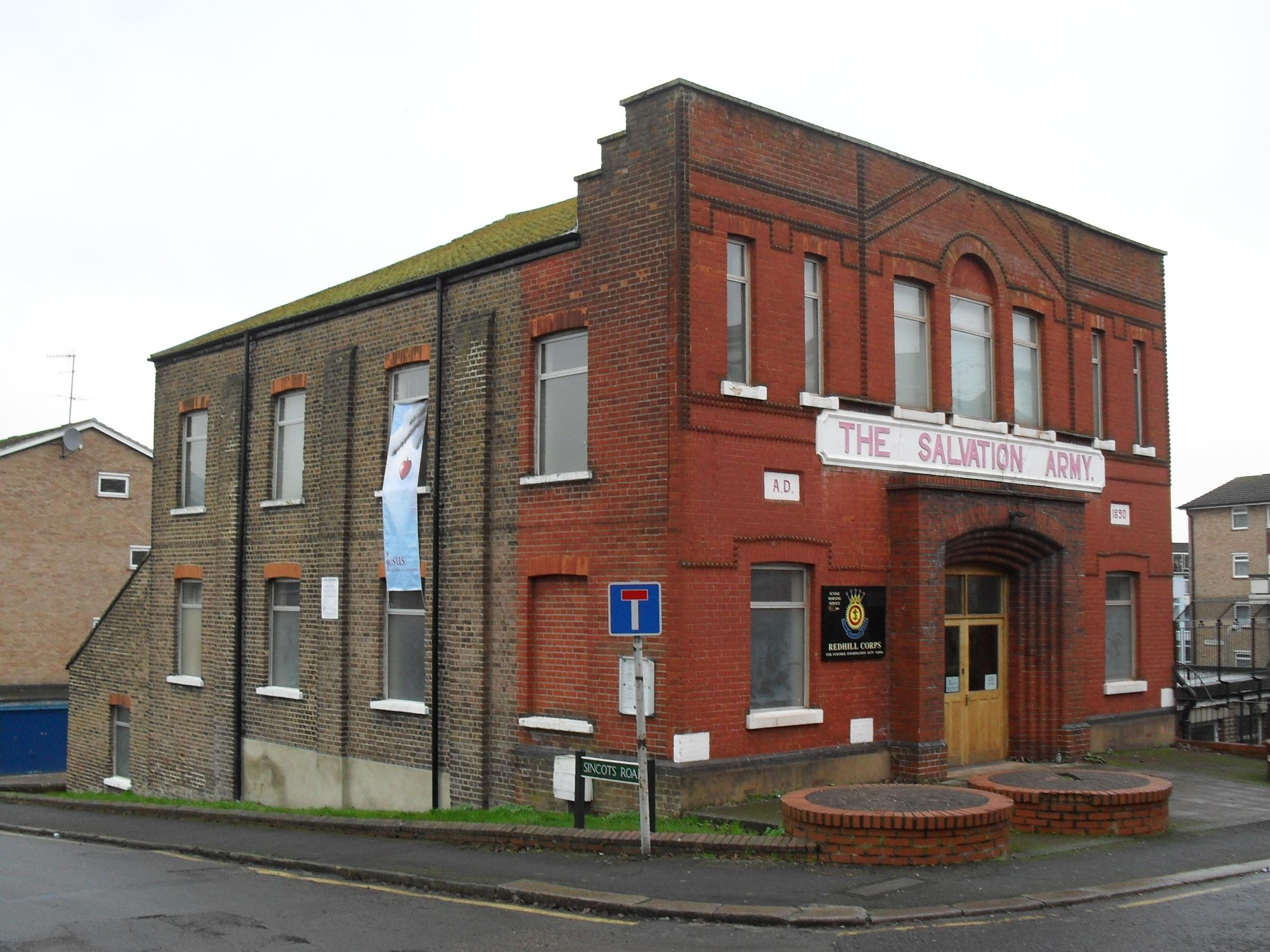
The railway town of Redhill, one of the borough's main centres of population, has places of worship serving many groups including The Salvation Army.

The borough of Reigate and Banstead, one of 11 local government districts in the English county of Surrey, has more than 80 current and former places of worship. There are 70 places of worship in active use and a further 13 at which religious services are no longer held but which survive in alternative uses.

The majority of residents are Christian, according to the results of the United Kingdom's most recent census, and most places of worship in the borough serve Christian denominations—although three mosques have opened since 1978 and the Subud and Kosmon movements have also established worship centres. The Church of England, the country's Established Church, has nearly 30 congregations; there are six Roman Catholic churches; and several congregations of Methodists, Baptists, Evangelicals, Open Brethren and the United Reformed Church each have their own church or chapel. The Plymouth Brethren Christian Church have a major regional meeting hall at Horley and several smaller meeting rooms in the surrounding area.

English Heritage has awarded listed status to 11 places of worship in the borough of Reigate and Banstead. A building is defined as "listed" when it is placed on a statutory register of buildings of "special architectural or historic interest" in accordance with the Planning (Listed Buildings and Conservation Areas) Act 1990. The Department for Culture, Media and Sport, a Government department, is responsible for this; English Heritage, a non-departmental public body, acts as an agency of the department to administer the process and advise the department on relevant issues. There are three grades of listing status. Grade I, the highest, is defined as being of "exceptional interest"; Grade II* is used for "particularly important buildings of more than special interest"; and Grade II, the lowest, is used for buildings of "special interest". As of February 2001, there were 5 Grade I-listed buildings, 18 with Grade II* status and 388 Grade II-listed buildings in the district. The borough council also maintains a list of locally listed buildings, of which there are 526 As of 2022 (including 12 places of worship). Such buildings are of "local architectural or historic interest", often characterised by "good design, traditional materials and ... historic fabric" and in many cases are situated in conservation areas.

== Overview of the borough ==
Reigate and Banstead is in the east of Surrey.

Reigate and Banstead is one of 11 local government areas in Surrey, an inland county in southeast England immediately south of London. Situated in the eastern part of the county, it covers 12,913 acres (5,226 ha) and had a population of 137,835 at the time of the United Kingdom Census 2011. This makes it Surrey's most populous local authority, and it was also the fastest growing between 2001 and 2009. Clockwise from the north, it shares borders with the London boroughs of Sutton and Croydon, the district of Tandridge in Surrey, the borough of Crawley of West Sussex, and the Surrey local authorities of Mole Valley District and Epsom and Ewell Borough.

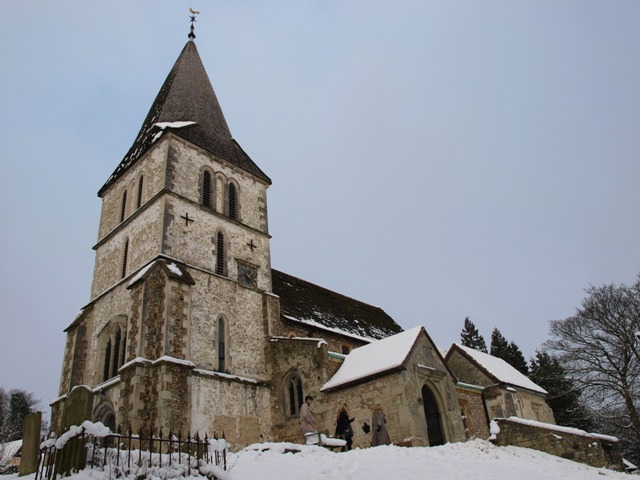
The isolated parish church of St Katharine at Merstham stands on elevated ground above the village.

The borough is mostly urban or suburban in nature and has four main towns: Horley in the south, Redhill and neighbouring Reigate in the centre, and Banstead in the northwest. About two-thirds of the borough's residents live in these places. Reigate (originally known as Cherchefelle) has ancient origins, but Horley and Redhill are Victorian railway towns and the downland village of Banstead grew with the outward expansion of Greater London, which adjoins the borough's northern edge. Of the larger villages, Merstham's ancient origins are still visible, but it became a centre for quarrying in the 18th and 19th centuries and a major housing estate was built in the 1950s. Kingswood is characterised by "leafy suburban surroundings", while Tadworth saw much interwar and postwar housing growth. Nearby Walton-on-the-Hill remains a "pleasant Victorian village" with a church, chapel, village green and pond—and a manor house which has in its grounds a church and spiritual sanctuary belonging to the Kosmon movement.

Eight ancient parish churches survive in the district. Reigate's, St Mary's Church, dedicated to St Mary Magdalen, is among the largest in Surrey: the nave and chancel are respectively 77 1/2 by 20 feet (23.6 m × 6.1 m) and 44 1/2 by 19 feet (13.6 m × 5.8 m) at their maximum dimensions, and there are aisles and chapels on both sides. The "curious and puzzling plan" shows evidence of gradual growth over several centuries since its 12th-century origin. The layout of All Saints Church at Banstead "suggest[s] a possible pre-Conquest origin", but most of the work is 13th-century. Lord of the manor John de Walton founded Walton-on-the-Hill's parish church in the early 13th century, but most of the fabric is two centuries newer. A church has stood by the River Mole at Horley since the 12th century, but the original (presumably timber) building was replaced by the present St Bartholomew's Church in the 14th century. Chipstead's parish church (Note: This is situated in the village of Hooley, but the parish is known as Chipstead.) is 12th- and 13th-century, and Merstham's ancient church ("strangely isolated" in relation to the modern settlement) is a 12th-century replacement for an older building. Gatton—a tiny hamlet dominated by the Gatton Park estate, and for many years a famous rotten borough—was recorded in the Domesday survey of 1086 as having a church, and some old fabric remains. Many of these churches were restored or greatly altered in Victorian times; and the eighth ancient church, St Peter's at Woodmansterne (which was recorded in the Domesday survey), was completely rebuilt in 1876 and no earlier work survives.

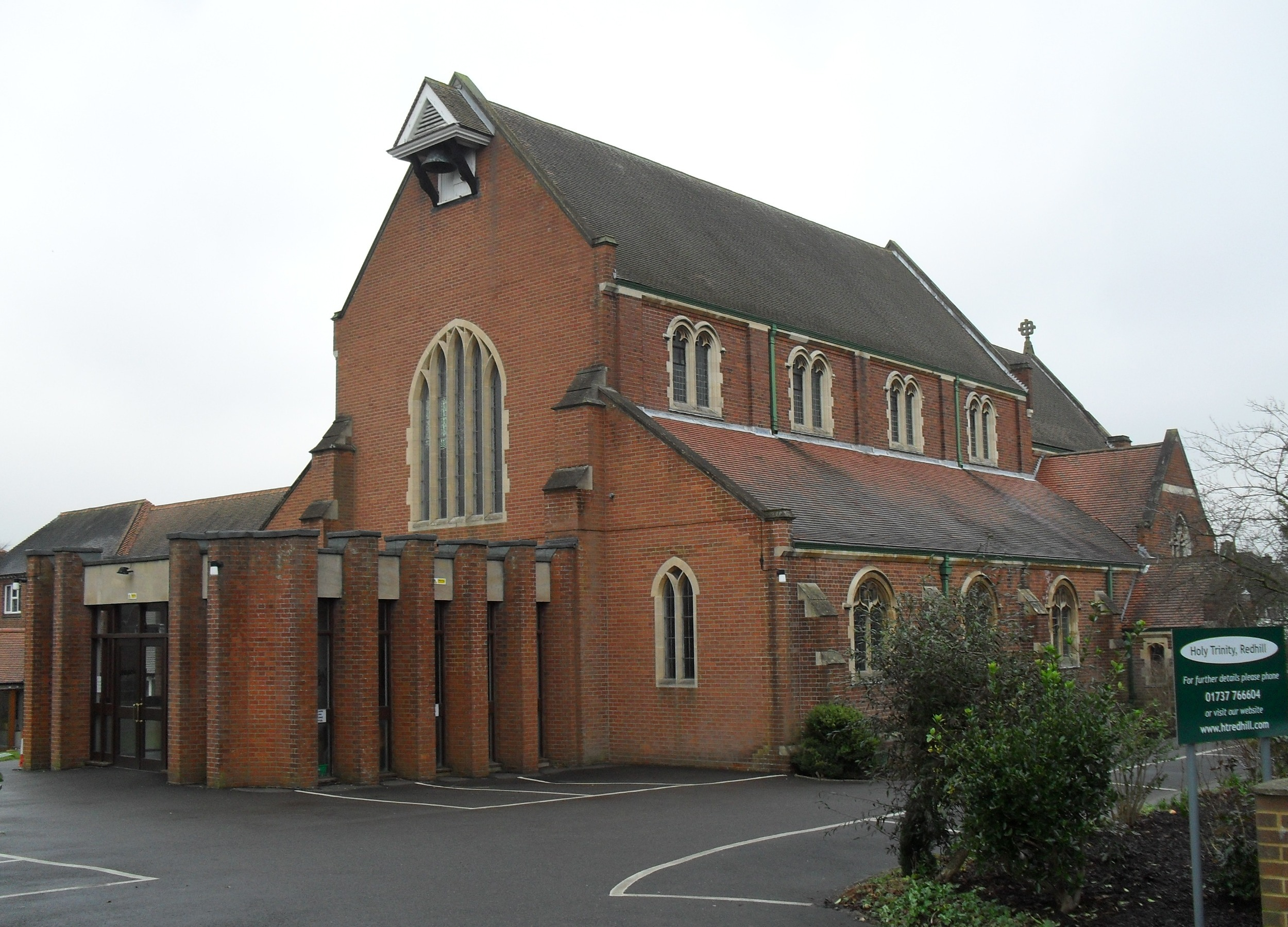
The borough's Victorian and Edwardian growth was served by churches such as Holy Trinity at Redhill (1906; porch added 1967).

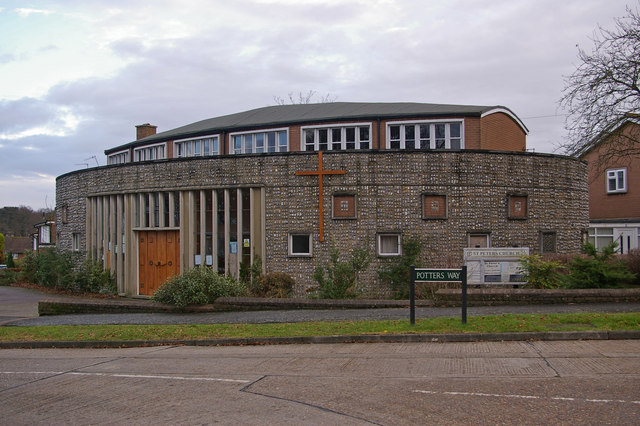
St Peter's Church in Woodhatch (pictured in 2008) closed in that year and was sold in 2010.

Restoration work was not the only theme of the 19th century. The growth of the main towns in the Victorian era and into the 20th century prompted the building of many more Anglican churches. In Reigate, St Mark (1860) and St Luke (1871) supplemented the old parish church, and St Philip (1863) was built a chapel of ease to St Mark. Redhill could no longer rely on Reigate's churches as the opening of the railway transformed it from "a country common into one of the most important towns in Surrey", so St John the Evangelist (1843), St Matthew (1866) and Holy Trinity (1906) were provided. A church once existed in Burgh Heath in Banstead parish, but as early as 1725 "no service [had] been held there within living memory" and the last traces of it disappeared in the late 19th century. A replacement dedicated to St Mary was built in 1908–09. Kingswood was originally a liberty and an exclave of Ewell parish; churches were built in the village (St Andrew, 1848–52) and at Lower Kingswood (originally dedicated to St Sophia, then to Jesus Christ the Wisdom of God). The latter, opened as a mission church in 1891 by Cosmo Bonsor, is a remarkable Byzantine-style building decorated with many types of marble and with remains taken from ancient sites in the Near and Middle East. Among these are capitals retrieved from such places as the northern quarter of Ephesus and the Monastery of Stoudios, St Mary's Church at Blachernae, the Palace of Blachernae, the Church of the Pantocrator and another church which is now the Eski Imaret Mosque, all in Constantinople. More modest Anglican churches were provided in the early 20th century at Tadworth (originally in Kingswood parish) in 1912 and Nork (1930), and in the Victorian era at Sidlow (1861) and South Merstham (1898). The last named church was destroyed by a World War II bomb and had to be rebuilt; designed by E.F. Starling and opened in 1951, the new building may have been the first postwar church built for the Diocese of Southwark. Nearby, the Church of the Epiphany was founded in 1955 on a housing estate built by London County Council near Merstham railway station, and in the same year St Peter's Church was built to serve housing development south of Reigate town centre. (Both of the 1955 churches closed within 60 years: St Peter's went out of use in 2008, and the Diocese of Southwark closed the Church of the Epiphany in January 2015 and revoked its marriage licence with effect from 30 April that year.) Horley's rapid postwar growth also necessitated the opening of two churches to supplement St Bartholomew's: St Francis and St Wilfrid date from 1958 and 1970 respectively; and at Salfords, a residential area north of Horley, a church was completed in 1967. Two unusual Anglican churches can be found on Reigate Heath: a tin tabernacle opened in 1907, and 27 years earlier the roundhouse of an 18th-century windmill was converted into the Chapel of St Cross (now Reigate Mill Church). English Heritage state that this is "probably the only windmill in England in use as a church".

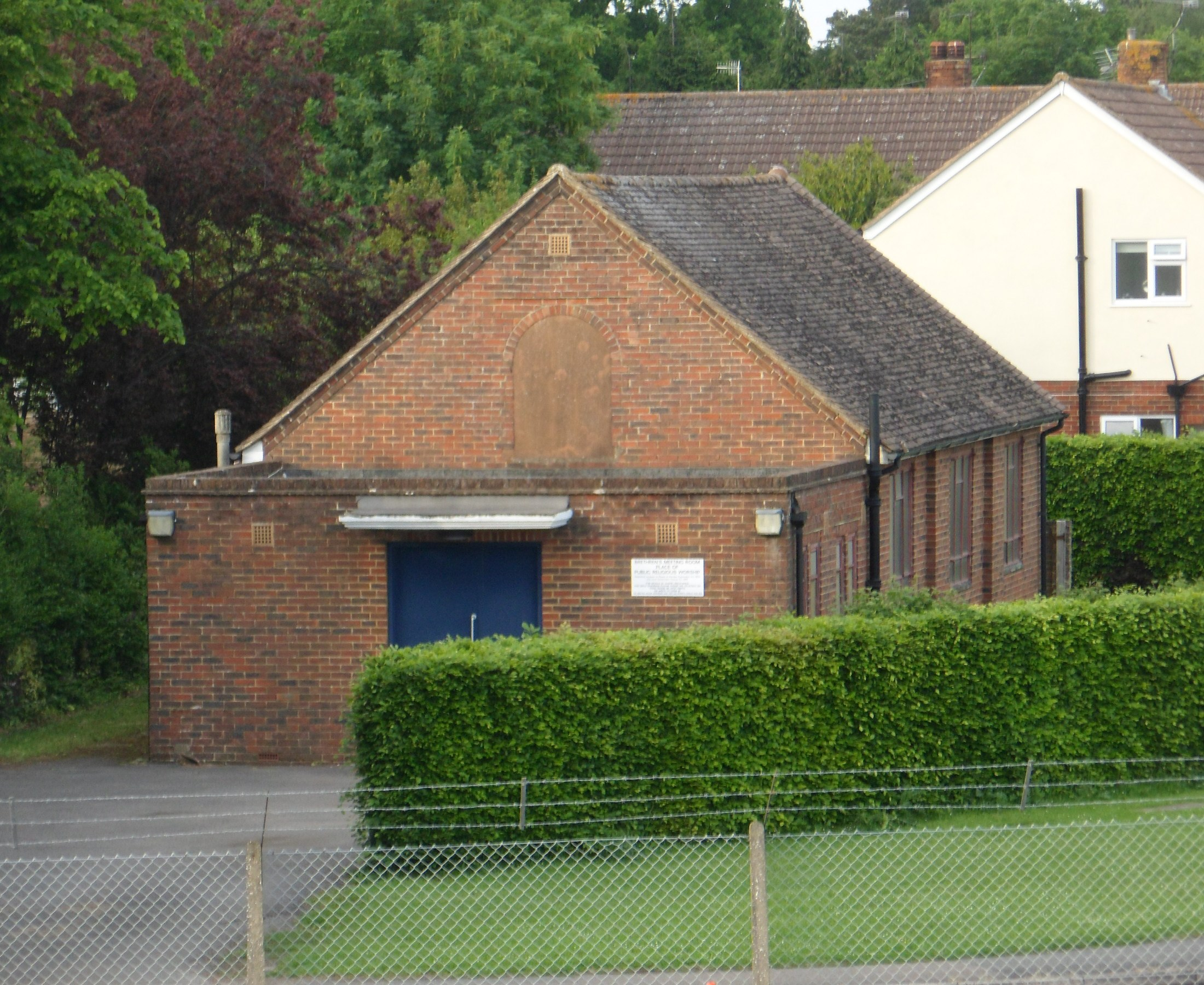
Plymouth Brethren are strongly represented in the area. This meeting room at The Grove in Horley existed by 1963.

For many years, Redhill was the only local place of worship for Roman Catholics. The first chapel, built in 1860 and registered in 1862, was superseded by St Joseph's Church in the High Street in 1898. This building was deregistered in 1984 and demolished, and a new church with the same dedication was built in its place. Reigate's Catholic church opened in 1938, but the 1960s saw the denomination's most rapid growth locally. Merstham's church was built in 1958–59 and registered in 1960. At Tadworth, a temporary church also registered in that year was replaced in 1966 by the present St John the Evangelist's Church. A similar thing happened in Horley, where the original Church of the English Martyrs on Ladbroke Road (registered for marriages in 1941) was superseded in 1962 by a new building on Vicarage Lane. Redhill was also the local centre for Baptist worship of various styles. Charles Spurgeon helped to found the General Baptist cause there, and a town-centre chapel (1868) was superseded by the present building in 1961. The Redhill church helped or founded the present Merstham (1897), Earlswood (1909) and Reigate (1995) Baptist churches. Meanwhile, Strict Baptists have chapels at Station Road in Redhill town centre and Shaw's Corner at the Reigate border.

Primitive and Wesleyan Methodist chapels were numerous in the area by the early 20th century. The Methodist Statistical Returns published in 1947 (Note: The statistical return was compiled between 1940 and 1947 with the aim of documenting all Methodist chapels extant at that time: their location, previous affiliation prior to the Methodist Union of 1932, capacity, building materials and similar details.) recorded the existence of former Primitive Methodist chapels in Redhill (Brighton Road) and Reigate (one in Lesbourne Road and another in the Meadvale area), and chapels of Wesleyan origin in Banstead, Burgh Heath, Earlswood, Horley, Redhill (London Road), Reigate (High Street) and South Merstham. Congregations of Methodists still meet in Banstead, Horley, Redhill and Reigate, but only the last named still occupy their original chapel (erected in 1884). Replacement churches were built in Banstead, Horley and Redhill in 1971, 1960 and 1992 respectively. The chapels at Burgh Heath and South Merstham have closed and are no longer extant, but the two ex-Primitive Methodist chapels in Reigate survive in alternative uses, and Earlswood's ex-Wesleyan chapel (Note: Although this was recorded in the Methodist Statistical Returns, its registration had been cancelled in 1937.) was acquired by a Muslim group and converted into the Jamia Masjid Al Mustafa.

Congregations of the United Reformed Church (Note: The United Reformed Church denomination was formed from the amalgamation of the Congregational Church and the Presbyterian Church of England in 1972.) are found in Banstead (established in 1940), Redhill (where the Congregational and Presbyterian causes date from 1860 and 1901 respectively) and Reigate, where the Victorian chapel on the High Street was replaced by a 1970s building in the South Park suburb. Brethren groups of various types are also strong in the area. Some churches now characterised as Evangelical originally had an Open Brethren character, such as Sandcross Church; others such as Lee Street Church, Woodlands Chapel and Shrewsbury Chapel still do. The Plymouth Brethren Christian Church have a main meeting hall on the edge of Horley, at Whitmore Way; this was registered in 1992, but a meeting room (still extant as a local facility) existed at The Grove by 1963 and two other local meeting rooms exist in Earlswood.

== Religious affiliation ==
According to the United Kingdom Census 2011, 137,835 people lived in the borough of Reigate and Banstead. Of these, 61.9% identified themselves as Christian, 1.91% were Muslim, 1.36% were Hindu, 0.45% were Buddhist, 0.21% were Jewish, 0.15% were Sikh, 0.35% followed another religion, 26.31% claimed no religious affiliation and 7.35% did not state their religion. The proportion of Christians was much higher than the 59.38% in England as a whole. Adherents of Islam, Judaism and Sikhism and Buddhism were much less prevalent in the district than in England overall: in 2011, 5.02% of people in England were Muslim, 0.79% were Sikh, 0.49% were Jewish and 0.45% were Buddhist. The proportions of people who followed Hinduism and religions not mentioned in the Census were slightly lower than the national figures of 1.52% and 0.43% respectively, and the proportion of people with no religious affiliation was higher than the 24.74% recorded at a national level.

== Administration ==
=== Anglican churches ===
Administratively, Reigate and Banstead borough is split between two Church of England dioceses: the Anglican Diocese of Southwark, the seat of which is Southwark Cathedral in London, and the Diocese of Guildford, whose cathedral is at Guildford in Surrey. Five churches are part of the Diocese of Guildford's Epsom Deanery, one of six deaneries in the Archdeaconry of Dorking: these are the churches at Banstead, Burgh Heath, Nork, Tattenham Corner and Walton-on-the-Hill. The Diocese of Southwark's Reigate Deanery, part of the Reigate Archdeaconry and the Croydon Episcopal Area, covers the six churches in Reigate, three each in Horley, Merstham and Redhill, and those at Chipstead, Gatton, Kingswood, Lower Kingswood, Salfords, Sidlow, Tadworth and Woodmansterne.

=== Roman Catholic churches ===
The borough's five Roman Catholic churches are administered by the Roman Catholic Diocese of Arundel and Brighton, whose cathedral is at Arundel in West Sussex. The churches at Merstham, Redhill and Reigate—which together form the three-church Parish of the Nativity of the Lord—are part of the Redhill Deanery, one of 13 deaneries in the diocese. Banstead and Tadworth's churches are in the Epsom Deanery.

=== Other denominations ===
Earlswood, Horley, Merstham, Redhill and Reigate Baptist Churches are within the Gatwick Network of the South Eastern Baptist Association. The East Surrey District of the neighbouring London Baptist Association administers Woodmansterne Baptist Church. The Sutton Methodist Circuit includes two of Reigate and Banstead's Methodist congregations—at Banstead and Tattenham Corner (based at St Mark's United Church, a joint Anglican and Methodist place of worship). The Redhill & East Grinstead Methodist Circuit covers Horley, Redhill and Reigate's Methodist churches. The Southern Synod, one of 13 synods of the United Reformed Church in the United Kingdom, administers that denomination's churches at Banstead, Redhill, Reigate and Walton-on-the-Hill. Lower Kingswood Evangelical Free Church at Lower Kingswood, Merland Rise Church at Tadworth and Tollgate Evangelical Church at South Earlswood are members of two Evangelical groups: the Fellowship of Independent Evangelical Churches (FIEC), a pastoral and administrative network of about 500 churches with an evangelical outlook; and Affinity (formerly the British Evangelical Council), a network of conservative Evangelical congregations throughout Great Britain. Lee Street Church in Horley is one of 11 churches in the South East region of Partnership UK, a charitable incorporated organisation which acts as a support network for independent and self-governing churches.

== Listed status ==
Grade	Criteria
Grade I	Buildings of exceptional interest, sometimes considered to be internationally important.
Grade II*	Particularly important buildings of more than special interest.
Grade II	Buildings of national importance and special interest.
Locally listed (L)	Buildings considered by the Council to be "an important part of [the local] heritage due to [their] architectural, historic or archaeological significance".

== Current places of worship ==
Current places of worship
Name	Image	Location	Denomination/ Affiliation	Grade	Notes	Refs
All Saints Church (More images)		Banstead; 51.3221°N 0.2008°W	Anglican	II*	Externally the appearance of this small stone and flint church relates to G.E. Street's restoration in 1861, but it is "very rewarding inside" because of features such as the unusual arcades with a mixture of chamfered and unchamfered arches and one "very curious" octagonal pier. The wide tower has a shingled broach spire. The building dates from the late 12th to early 13th century.	
ChristChurch Banstead (More images)		Banstead; 51.3236°N 0.1971°W	Evangelical	–	The present building of 1971 (extended in 1976 and subsequently) is the successor to a modest tin tabernacle dating from the early 20th century, erected on land bought in 1896. The 250-capacity iron and timber building was damaged in World War II, and by 1970 the congregation had outgrown it. The cause was originally a non-denominational mission; worship originally took place in a house, and the church was officially founded in March 1907. At that time it was the only Nonconformist church to serve Banstead, Chipstead and Woodmansterne. A marriage licence was granted in April 1914. Renamed Banstead Baptist Church in 1960, it was rededicated under its present name on 8 September 2013.	
Banstead Methodist Church (More images)		Banstead; 51.3184°N 0.2131°W	Methodist	–	A combined school and Wesleyan chapel in Burgh Heath served Methodists in the Banstead area until a church was built near Nork Park in 1934–35 (it opened on 9 February 1935, five months after construction started, and was registered for marriages in June 1936). The site had been acquired in 1926. The building was structurally unsound and was demolished in 1971; it was then rebuilt on the same site but in a different style.	
St Ann's Church (More images)		Banstead; 51.3215°N 0.2116°W	Roman Catholic	–	Worship originally took place in a hut which was registered for marriages in July 1936. This "unpretentious" permanent church, of brick with a tiled roof, replaced it in 1950; its marriage licence dates from August of that year. C.W. Glover and Partners were the architects, J.H. Alleyn rebuilt the sanctuary in 1955 and more additions were made in the 1960s and 1970s.	
Banstead United Reformed Church (More images)		Banstead; 51.3248°N 0.1937°W	United Reformed Church	–	Banstead Congregational Church was officially constituted in 1946, but worship had been taking place in the local school since 1940. A permanent church was founded on 10 June 1950 and finished a year later, at which point it was registered for worship, and the building was extended in 1957, 1962 and 2000. Its marriage registration dates from July 1952.	
St Mary's Church		Burgh Heath; 51.3073°N 0.2178°W	Anglican	L	The long-vanished church at Burgh Heath, which later became part of the parish of Banstead, was succeeded by a chequered flint and stone replacement built to the design of architects Whitfield and Thomas in 1908–09. The nave has aisles on both sides.	
St John the Evangelist's Church (More images)		Earlswood; 51.2294°N 0.1764°W	Anglican	II*	Redhill's oldest church stands on Earlswood Common and was built in three stages: 1842–43 by J.T. Knowles, 1867 by Ford & Robert Hesketh, and 1889–95 by John Loughborough Pearson. Flint and limestone were the early materials, to which Pearson added pale stock brickwork when he revamped the chancel and nave and built the landmark corner tower and spire.	
Earlswood Baptist Church (More images)		Earlswood; 51.2301°N 0.1667°W	Baptist	–	Redhill Baptist Church founded a Baptist mission in the suburb of Earlswood in 1909. The original tin tabernacle was replaced by the present larger building in 1978; this was registered for worship and for marriages in December of that year. Improvements were made in 1997 (when the church hall was built) and 2008, and since 1987 the church has been independent of the Redhill cause.	
Jamia Masjid Al-Mustafa (More images)		Earlswood; 51.2281°N 0.1722°W	Muslim	–	The building was registered as a Wesleyan Methodist church between December 1900 and May 1937. In 1978, a Muslim society which had formed that year in Redhill bought it and converted it into a 500-capacity mosque. It is linked to the Barelvi movement of Sunni Islam. Under its present identity it was registered for marriages in August 2007.	
Meeting Room (More images)		Earlswood; 51.2321°N 0.1669°W	Plymouth Brethren Christian Church	–	This Brethren meeting room at the junction of Redstone Road and Hooley Lane and opened in June 1966. It has been registered for marriages since April 1971. It is under the trusteeship of the main meeting hall for this area, at Whitmore Way in Horley.	
Meeting Room (More images)		Earlswood; 51.2280°N 0.1732°W	Plymouth Brethren Christian Church	–	This meeting room on Woodlands Road is also linked to the main meeting hall at Whitmore Way in Horley. It was registered in October 1997.	
St Andrew's Church (More images)		Gatton; 51.2608°N 0.1736°W	Anglican	I	The 13th-century church of the Gatton Park estate was rebuilt from its Perpendicular Gothic origins in the 18th century and again in 1834, when Lord Monson commissioned E. Webb to redesign it as a "picturesque Gothick composition". A covered path once ran from the north transept to the house. The tower rises in three stages and is very slim.	
Royal Alexandra and Albert School Chapel (More images)		Gatton; 51.2624°N 0.1740°W	Non-denominational	–	Although principally for use by the school, this chapel (built in 1956 to the design of Adams, Gray and Adamson, the firm which had designed the school's dormitories two years earlier) was registered for public worship and for the solemnisation of marriages in July 1987.	
St Margaret's Church (More images)		Hooley; 51.2923°N 0.1608°W	Anglican	I	Most parts of this large village church are 13th-century, and a blocked 12th-century window survives. The tower of 1631 straddles the crossing of the cruciform building, whose walls are of flint and stone. There is also some brickwork to the tower. Norman Shaw added the north aisle and some other parts in 1883. Sir Edward Banks is commemorated by a monument inside.	
St Bartholomew's Church (More images)		Horley; 51.1698°N 0.1758°W	Anglican	I	The church stands between the A23 Brighton Road and the River Mole and has 14th-century origins. Before the Reformation it was dedicated to St Mary the Virgin. The present appearance is attributable to Arthur Blomfield's restoration (called an "obliteration" by Ian Nairn) in 1881. The north doorway and north arcade retain their 14th-century appearances, though.	
St Francis' Church (More images)		Horley; 51.1708°N 0.1576°W	Anglican	–	The church was built on the Balcombe Road in 1958 as a combined worship centre and hall. The church section of the simple l-shaped building also has vestries to one side.	
St Wilfrid's Church (More images)		Horley; 51.1804°N 0.1707°W	Anglican	–	Constructed of concrete in 1970 using the portal framing technique, the l-shaped building has a church section and a hall section which link together. There is an entrance on the south side and vestries to the west.	
Horley Baptist Church (new building) (More images)		Horley; 51.1753°N 0.1739°W	Baptist	–	Plans for the new church, replacing the smaller 1881 building, were revealed in 2012. The church bought the former Court Lodge Primary School, demolished it and built a new church and care home in its place. Worship and activities took place in another building on the site and at Oakwood School while this happened in 2014–15. The new two-storey church was designed by MEB Design Ltd, and building contractors Caldera Construction carried out the £1.75m building project. The first service was held on 5 July 2015, and it was registered for marriages in November of the same year.	
Horley Methodist Church (More images)		Horley; 51.1727°N 0.1675°W	Methodist	–	Horley's first Methodist church belonged to the Primitive Methodists; Wesleyans met in a room from 1909 then a hall from 1911 (registered as Wesley Hall in March 1918), and the Primitive Methodist congregation joined in the 1930s. Growth in the congregation by the late 1950s necessitated a new building—a cruciform structure which was opened on 11 June 1960.	
Gatwick Islamic Centre (More images)		Horley; 51.1732°N 0.1613°W	Muslim	–	This mosque and community centre is operated by the Gatwick Bangladeshi Islamic Community Association. When it opened in September 2011, it brought to an end a peripatetic 11-year period in which worshippers had used various rented halls and rooms in the town. The congregation is drawn from Horley and several neighbouring towns.	
Lee Street Church (More images)		Horley; 51.1783°N 0.1798°W	Open Brethren	–	Originally known as Lee Street Hall, this was registered for the use of Open (Christian) Brethren in 1965. As of 2002, Sunday services were held at the church and there were Wednesday home groups.	
Grove Meeting Room (More images)		Horley; 51.1695°N 0.1593°W	Plymouth Brethren Christian Church	–	Plymouth Brethren had a place of worship in the town by 1911, and a building on this site was recorded as being in existence in 1963. The registration for worship dates from May 1984.	
Meeting Room (More images)		Horley; 51.1765°N 0.1846°W	Plymouth Brethren Christian Church	–	Standing on Whitmore Way in the town is the local centre for Plymouth Brethren worship. It was registered for worship and for marriages in March 1992.	
Church of the English Martyrs (More images)		Horley; 51.1751°N 0.1713°W	Roman Catholic	–	"One of the first churches in the county in the modern style" (i.e. post-Gothic Revival and post-Second Vatican Council) was designed by Justin H. Alleyn in 1961–62. There are similarities with his church at Ewell: the use of yellow brick, windows set in triangular sections and containing stained glass by Pierre Fourmaintraux, and a bell tower (here, completely detached from the octagonal main building). It was registered for worship and for marriages in March 1962. An earlier church of the same dedication had been registered in 1941.	
St Andrew's Church (More images)		Kingswood; 51.2857°N 0.2195°W	Anglican	II	The design of Benjamin Ferrey's parish church for Kingswood village was based on that of the 14th-century St John the Baptist's Church at Shottesbrooke, Berkshire. It was funded by Thomas Alcock and was built between 1848 and 1852. The tall tower and spire are at the centre of the cruciform building, which has transepts, a chancel and a shorter nave. Flint and stone are the main materials.	
Church of the Wisdom of God (More images)		Lower Kingswood; 51.2692°N 0.2116°W	Anglican	I	A "most remarkable" church, especially for its opulent interior, this was designed by Sidney Barnsley in 1891 at the request of Edwin Freshfield and Cosmo Bonsor. The Free Byzantine brick exterior leads to a nave and chancel without any separation and a polygonal apse. Corinthian capitals inside include some from the 4th and 6th centuries, retrieved from churches and other sites in Ephesus and Constantinople.	
Lower Kingswood Evangelical Free Church (More images)		Lower Kingswood; 51.2702°N 0.2097°W	Evangelical	–	This originated as a mission hall from an Evangelical cause at Tadworth. The original tin tabernacle was superseded by a single-storey wooden building in 1931; this was demolished and replaced by the larger brick-built present church in 2008. It opened on 2 November of that year and was registered for marriages in May 2009. The Tadworth church closed in 1972 and its members joined this church. A partnership with Tollgate Evangelical Church in Earlswood is now in place.	
St Katharine's Church (More images)		Merstham; 51.2687°N 0.1520°W	Anglican	II*	The church stands on the rising slope of the North Downs well away from the centre of the present urban area. It is a solid, heavy building of flint and stone quarried in Merstham; some Bath Stone dressings were added during Victorian restoration work. The tower was built in the 1220s and has a broach spire. Much 13th-century work survives inside. The five bells date from between the 14th century and 1774.	
All Saints Church (More images)		Merstham; 51.2566°N 0.1505°W	Anglican	–	Princess Frederica of Hanover laid the first stone of South Merstham's new parish church in July 1897. It opened seven months later. A red-brick Early English Gothic Revival building, it had cost £2,300. It lasted only until 19 April 1942, when a parachute mine blew it up; Canada Hall was built next to it and was used temporarily until E.F. Starling's permanent brick-built church was ready in 1951.	
Merstham Baptist Church (More images)		Merstham; 51.2584°N 0.1456°W	Baptist	–	A Baptist chapel was built in summer 1874 on Merstham High Street with help from the chapel at Redhill. The congregation moved to a new site on Weldon Way on the London County Council's housing estate in 1958, and it was registered in July 1959. A proposal to demolish the new building and replace it with a replacement church and houses was first mentioned in 2002; demolition has taken place and the church meets in a temporary building on the site.	
St Teresa's Church (More images)		Merstham; 51.2594°N 0.1449°W	Roman Catholic	–	Merstham's Catholics travelled to Redhill for Mass until All Saints Church offered Canada Hall as a temporary venue. In November 1958, Bishop of Southwark Cyril Cowderoy founded a permanent church on the London County Council estate. Justin H. Alleyn was the architect; his design uses concrete and brick extensively. The first service was held on 7 October 1959, and the church was formally registered in January 1960.	
St Paul's Church (More images)		Nork; 51.3256°N 0.2242°W	Anglican	–	The Anglican church of the Nork estate near Banstead dates from 1930 and was designed by W.E. Bowden. On 17 December 1931 a Conventional District with the name "District of St Paul, Nork" was formed from parts of Banstead, Cuddington and Ewell's parishes.	
Holy Trinity Church (More images)		Redhill; 51.2474°N 0.1669°W	Anglican	–	R.H. Mew designed this new red-brick church for the north of Redhill in 1906. The red-brick and Bath Stone building lacks its intended corner tower. In 1967, E.F. Starling added the entrance porch to the Perpendicular Gothic Revival church, and more works took place in 1991 and 2004. A parish was created in 1907 out of St Matthew's territory.	
St Matthew's Church (More images)		Redhill; 51.2407°N 0.1721°W	Anglican	L	J.M.K. Hähn's "very spiky" Decorated Gothic Revival town-centre church has a tall broach spire of Bargate stone, contrasting with the predominant Reigate Stone in a way Ian Nairn described as "quite exciting". The entrance is in the base of the tower.	
Redhill Baptist Church (More images)		Redhill; 51.2391°N 0.1810°W	Baptist	–	Redhill's General Baptist church was founded in 1864 and occupied a chapel at London Road between 1868 and 1961, when a new building was erected at Hatchlands Road. This was registered for worship and for marriages in August 1961, and was enlarged and modernised in 2009 for £1.8 million.	
Redhill Methodist Church (More images)		Redhill; 51.2424°N 0.1687°W	Methodist	–	The only open place of Methodist worship in Redhill has succeeded several others: there were five in 1911 (two Wesleyan and three Primitive), and the Central Hall near the present church was registered between 1934 and 1990. The present church dates from 1992.	
Al-Yaqeen Masjid (More images)		Redhill; 51.2419°N 0.1705°W	Muslim	–	These premises on Warwick Road, now converted into a small mosque, were originally built and registered as a Plymouth Brethren meeting room in April 1968.	
Shrewsbury Chapel (More images)		Redhill; 51.2385°N 0.1800°W	Open Brethren	–	Shrewsbury Hall, as it was originally known, was registered for marriages in June 1895. As of 2002 there were two services on Sundays and another on Wednesday evenings. Refurbishment and building works took place in 2019–20.	
Redhill Tabernacle (More images)		Redhill; 51.2406°N 0.1691°W	Redeemed Christian Church of God	II	In Strict Baptist use until the early 21st century, this is now used by the RCCG Pentecostal group. Strict Baptist ministry in Redhill began in 1855 when some worshippers who had used the old chapel at Tadworth rented a schoolroom for services. A permanent chapel was opened on Station Road on 21 July 1858 at a cost of £850. It has an appearance somewhere between Georgian and Classical with its plain, simple stock brick façade and a "humble" lack of details (except the stone below the gable inscribed Baptist chapel erected 1858). The three bays are symmetrical and have a central gabled porch. The round-arched windows have red-brick dressings.	
St Joseph's Church (More images)		Redhill; 51.2456°N 0.1632°W	Roman Catholic	–	The present church (registered for worship and for marriages in November 1988) is a modern successor to two earlier churches whose history goes back to 1860. Even before this, Mass was said at a house, Hooley Lodge, which had its own chapel. In 1899 the first permanent church and its associated buildings were demolished and replacements built on the High Street, and new congregations were founded at Reigate, Merstham and Horley. This second church was deregistered in February 1984.	
Salvation Army Hall (More images)		Redhill; 51.2385°N 0.1705°W	Salvation Army	–	This Salvation Army Corps is in the organisation's London South East Division. It was in use by 1911, although it was not registered for marriages until August 1935.	
Hope Chapel (More images)		Redhill; 51.2375°N 0.1815°W	Strict Baptist	–	Strict Baptist pastor Joseph Hatton, associated with Ebenezer Chapel at Smallfield and the Baptist chapel in Redhill's Station Road, founded a second place of worship in the town at Shaw's Corner (on the Redhill/Reigate border) in 1876. Under its present name it was registered for marriages in July 1880.	
Redhill United Reformed Church (More images)		Redhill; 51.2371°N 0.1823°W	United Reformed Church	L	A 500-capacity Congregational church was built on Chapel Road in Redhill in 1862 and opened on 4 September of that year. Later, St Paul's Presbyterian Church was built at Shaw's Corner on the border with Reigate; it was designed by G. Lethbridge, built in 1901–02 and was registered for marriages in May 1902. It is this church which survives as Redhill's only United Reformed Church. After the Congregational and Presbyterian Churches came together to form the new denomination in 1972, the Chapel Road and Shaw's Corner buildings continued as St Paul's Church and Christ Church respectively; but in 1987, an interregnum and the discovery of dry rot at Christ Church resulted in the two congregations uniting and moving into the Shaw's Corner building under the new name Redhill United Reformed Church.	
Reigate Mill Church (More images)		Reigate; 51.2363°N 0.2333°W	Anglican	II*	Reigate Mill, a post mill, dates from 1765. In 1880 its brick roundhouse was converted into a chapel, dedicated to St Cross (i.e. the Holy Cross), for use by the Anglican church; the first service was held on 14 September 1880. Later it was also used by Baptists, and it was under the name Reigate Heath Baptist Church that it became a listed building in 1951. A church bell was a later addition to the structure. It is currently in use as Reigate Mill Church as one of three places of worship in the Anglican parish of St Mary Magdalene.	
St Mary Magdalene's Church (More images)		Reigate; 51.2367°N 0.1973°W	Anglican	II*	Work on this large church (one of Surrey's biggest) began in about 1200—the "unexpectedly noble" arcades date from then—and continued until the 15th century. Henry Woodyer (1845) and George Gilbert Scott, Jr. (1877–81) restored it and largely created its present appearance. The materials are Reigate stone with Bath Stone dressings and Horsham Stone tiles to the roof. The Decorated Gothic appearance of the south chapel contrasts with the overall Perpendicular Gothic style of the church.	
Reigate Heath Church (More images)		Reigate; 51.2380°N 0.2243°W	Anglican	–	The third church in the parish of St Mary Magdalene is, like the Mill Church, situated on Reigate Heath. It is a tin tabernacle with a wooden frame. Regular services have been held on Sundays since it opened on 28 July 1907.	
St Mark's Church (More images)		Reigate; 51.2432°N 0.2034°W	Anglican	L	Near Reigate railway station, "an estate of big, detached, clunch-built houses, mostly in bulgy Gothic [Revival]" (many no longer surviving) has its own church in a similar style. It is a Decorated Gothic Revival-style building of 1860 designed by architects Field & Hilton, who may have been responsible for the housing as well. As well as a nave and chancel, there were aisles and transepts on both sides and a tower.	
St Philip's Church (More images)		Reigate; 51.2420°N 0.2117°W	Anglican	L	Nutley Lane Church (its original name) opened as a chapel of ease to St Mark's Church on 20 March 1863. It was built of pale Reigate stone and was funded by W. Phillips. It had no parochial responsibilities until 1950; between then and 1992 it officially served the southern part of St Mark's parish, and in 1992 it was granted its own separate parish.	
Reigate Methodist Church (More images)		Reigate; 51.2373°N 0.2091°W	Methodist	L	Ian Nairn called this "an awful bit of Free Gothic by Frederick Boreham". It was built of Reigate stone in 1884 and has a slightly Romanesque main elevation of two bays rising to a central gable. It replaced an older Wesleyan chapel on Nutley Lane.	
Woodlands Chapel (More images)		Reigate; 51.2321°N 0.1987°W	Open Brethren	–	This Brethren assembly hall was registered for worship in July 1964 and for marriages nine months later. It held three Sunday and one weekday service per week as of 2002.	
Friends Meeting House (More images)		Reigate; 51.2372°N 0.1939°W	Quaker	–	The Quaker cause in Reigate originated around the time George Fox visited in 1655, and meetings started in 1668 or 1669 on the present site. The first building (1689–c. 1798) was altered in the latter year, but was replaced in 1856 or 1857 by a new meeting house in the same location. This had red brick walls with stone dressings and a Tuscan-columned semicircular porch. In turn this was demolished in 1984 and the land was used to build sheltered housing and a smaller modern place of worship—an octagonal room attached to the housing. The architects of both developments were Barber, Bundy and Partners.	
Church of the Holy Family (More images)		Reigate; 51.2414°N 0.2072°W	Roman Catholic	–	Edward J. Walters, son and architectural assistant of Frederick Walters, designed Reigate's Catholic church in the Early English Gothic Revival style in 1938. It was consecrated in the same year and opened officially in January 1939, although a marriage licence was not granted for a further 12 months. Red brick and stone are the principal materials, and there is a "striking" corner tower with a copper pyramid spire. A Mass Centre in a hut in Woodhatch was served from the church for about 50 years until 2003.	
Christ the King Church (More images)		Salfords; 51.2040°N 0.1667°W	Anglican	–	Salfords was originally in the parish of St Bartholomew's Church, Horley. A chapel of ease called Christ Church was built in 1881 and extended in 1892; but architect David Evelyn Nye's new church, built between 1958 and 1967 by local volunteers, replaced it. The cruciform structure has portal frames, tile and brick walls and a steep laminated timber roof.	
Emmanuel Church (More images)		Sidlow; 51.2078°N 0.1989°W	Anglican	L	Henry Clutton designed Sidlow's flint-built church, which mostly served local manor houses and country estates, in 1861. As well as the aisleless nave and chancel there are a corner tower, a vestry and an entrance porch. The roof has a bellcote. Ian Nairn called it "not attractive, but carefully thought out".	
Tollgate Evangelical Church (More images)		South Earlswood; 51.2161°N 0.1749°W	Evangelical	–	Tollgate Mission Hall was established on a site in Woodhatch Road in the South Earlswood area, but was superseded by the present church (originally named Tollgate Hall) in December 1952.	
St Luke's Church (More images)		South Park; 51.2268°N 0.2087°W	Anglican	L	This church, serving the South Park suburb southwest of Reigate town centre, resembles St Mark's Church but was built 11 years later in 1871. It is also of Reigate stone and has a two-aisled nave, chancel, vestry and side chapel, but no tower or spire. The west end was completely rebuilt in 1986: it now has a large wooden gable encasing a glazed section and a brick-built entrance area.	
Subud Hall (More images)		South Park; 51.2246°N 0.2090°W	Subud	–	The building dates from the 1880s and was originally a Congregational mission hall and school founded by the Reigate Congregational Church. Under the name New Mission Hall it was registered for marriages in May 1898. This lasted until November 1986, and the complex was later acquired by the Subud movement who established their own place of worship there. It was registered in April 1988.	
Reigate Park Church (More images)		South Park; 51.2291°N 0.2050°W	United Reformed Church	–	A disused 17th-century Presbyterian chapel in Reigate town centre was refurbished and turned into a Congregational chapel in 1801. It was replaced by another in 1819, enlarged in 1831, 1857–58 and 1868–69. It had a stone façade in the Romanesque Revival style and a corner tower and spire. The present church in the South Park suburb was registered for worship and for marriages in September 1975; it replaced the High Street building after it was demolished in 1973.	
Church of the Good Shepherd (More images)		Tadworth; 51.2897°N 0.2359°W	Anglican	L	Architect Charles Barry (Note: This architect is neither the Charles Barry who redesigned the Houses of Parliament nor his son, Charles Barry, Jr., who was principally associated with London buildings.) designed Tadworth's Anglican church in 1912. It was extended by one bay in 1963. The nave has north and south aisles with flat roofs, but the main roof is gabled and covered with clay tiles. Brown brick and stone are the main materials of the church itself.	
Merland Rise Church (More images)		Tadworth; 51.3014°N 0.2344°W	Evangelical	–	William C. Saunders was a pastor at the Lower Kingswood and Tadworth Evangelical mission halls. He lived near Tattenham Corner and, with his wife, helped to found the Tattenham Corner Evangelical Free Church on Merland Rise in a new housing estate between Tadworth and Tattenham Corner. Under that name it was registered for worship and for marriages in July 1967.	
St John the Evangelist's Church (More images)		Tadworth; 51.2916°N 0.2370°W	Roman Catholic	–	The first Catholic church with this dedication in Tadworth was established in King's Lodge on The Avenue in 1960. In 1966 a permanent building designed by architect F.G. Broadbent superseded it; it was registered for worship and for marriages in December 1966. A "well-built and dignified church" of pale brick in a simple Romanesque Revival style, its exterior also features a carved statue of its saint by Michael Clark prbs.	
Bethel Chapel (More images)		Tadworth; 51.2874°N 0.2316°W	Strict Baptist	–	Strict Baptists in the Tadworth area went to the chapel at Brockham until a chapel built in the grounds of the 17th-century Tadworth Court was obtained in 1822. Renamed Bethel, it was used until 1883 when a new building with the same name was built on Chapel Lane. The first service was held on 14 May 1883. Prime Minister David Lloyd George and his secretary came to a service unannounced in 1918. The chapel was registered for marriages in November 1905.	
St Mark's United Church (More images)		Tattenham Corner; 51.3090°N 0.2317°W	Anglican/Methodist	–	This was built as an Anglican church in 1967 to serve the housing areas around Tattenham Corner. After Great Tattenhams Methodist Church closed down—it had been registered for worship between 1954 and 2004—St Mark's became a joint church serving both denominations.	
St Peter's Church (More images)		Walton-on-the-Hill; 51.2818°N 0.2468°W	Anglican	II*	The 15th-century flint-built church retains little of its original appearance: architect Daniel Alexander, Jr. undertook a restoration in 1818, concentrating on the tower, and more renewal work was carried out in 1870 and 1895. The "small but remarkable" lead font has been dated to the 1150s, almost certainly making it Britain's oldest such font. A carved wooden desk inside has a Bible attached to a chain which came from Salisbury Cathedral (the Bible is newer than the chain: it was printed in 1795).	
Kosmon Sanctuary		Walton-on-the-Hill; 51.2830°N 0.2510°W	Kosmon Church	–	This spiritual movement's worship centre and sanctuary occupies part of a building on the estate of Walton Manor. It was registered for worship in September 1963 and was granted a marriage licence in June 1999.	
Christchurch United Reformed Church (More images)		Walton-on-the-Hill; 51.2829°N 0.2444°W	United Reformed Church	–	Dorking Congregational Church bought land in Walton-on-the-Hill in 1885 and built a tin tabernacle there to serve as a mission chapel. It opened on 11 June of that year, and a cottage was erected alongside in 1893. By 1908 it was stated that "the chapel is quite inadequate to the needs of this growing locality", and money was donated by the Church of England to fund a new building. This was registered for marriages in March 1912.	
Reigate Baptist Church (More images)		Woodhatch; 51.2252°N 0.1965°W	Baptist	–	This church was planted out of the Baptist church at Redhill in 1995. Several locations in the Woodhatch and Meadvale areas were used until the permanent church and community centre was ready in December 2005. This was registered for marriages in April 2006.	
Sandcross Church (More images)		Woodhatch; 51.2213°N 0.2063°W	Evangelical	–	A mission chapel was founded during World War II from a Brethren gospel hall in Redhill. A wooden church was built in 1947, a marriage registration (as Sandcross Hall) was granted in April 1954, and a new building (substantially extended in the 1990s) was erected in 1957. As of 2002, Sunday morning and evening and Thursday evening services were held.	
St Peter's Church (More images)		Woodmansterne; 51.3242°N 0.1690°W	Anglican	L	Joseph Clarke rebuilt the 13th-century church in this village in 1876–77 and E.F. Starling added the north aisle in 1960–61; no original fabric survives apart from one lancet window which was reset on the northwest side, and an ogee-headed piscina inside. The south side has an aisle and a transept, and the walls are of flint.	
Woodmansterne Baptist Church (More images)		Woodmansterne; 51.3160°N 0.1667°W	Baptist	–	The present church was built in 1936, but the cause has its origins in nearby Coulsdon: in 1907 a group of Baptists began meeting in a room above a shop there. The building has been added to in order to accommodate its growing congregation. Present membership stands at about 75. Under the name Coulsdon and Woodmansterne Baptist Church, the church was registered for marriages in August 1939.	

== Former places of worship ==
Former places of worship
Name	Image	Location	Denomination/ Affiliation	Grade	Notes	Refs
St John's Mission Hall (More images)		Earlswood; 51.2285°N 0.1663°W	Anglican	–	Also known as Hooley Mission Hall, this chapel of ease to St John the Evangelist's Church was built in 1910 and entered use the following year. Services continued until 1978 or later, but the building became a nursery school after the Diocese of Southwark sold it in 1995. It was never consecrated.	
Horley Baptist Church (old building) (More images)		Horley; 51.1768°N 0.1677°W	Baptist	–	The "excellent set of buildings" on Albert Road (comprising church, schoolroom, vestries and house) were built in 1881 for a Calvinistic Baptist congregation. By 2010 the 180-capacity building was too small, and in October 2012 the church acquired the Court Lodge Primary School a short distance away. This was demolished and replaced with a new larger church and 60-capacity care home in 2014–15. On 23 March 2013 the old church building was put up for sale; it is now a nursery school.	
Southlands Christian Church		Horley; 51.1731°N 0.1616°W	Non-denominational	–	Covenant Community Church International was founded in 2003 in Horley and took its present name the next year. The church occupied a building in nearby Salfords between 2007 and 2011, but this was destroyed by fire. Part of another former office building—this time on Horley High Street—was used later, but this had reverted to secular use by 2015.	
Margery Mission Hall (More images)		Margery; 51.2610°N 0.2065°W	Congregational	–	This was one of several Congregational mission chapels set up by Reigate Congregational Church in the late 19th century under Rev. George Adeney's ministry (1856–1897). It served Margery and the neighbouring hamlet of Mogador and was opened in 1885 at the expense of George Taylor, who continued to support it with time and finance after it opened. A well-attended Sunday school soon developed.	
Meadvale Hall (More images)		Meadvale; 51.2280°N 0.1872°W	Anglican	–	Another unconsecrated Anglican mission hall, this 19th-century building was bought by the Diocese of Southwark in 1886 to serve residents of the Meadvale area. Its use as a church continued until at least 1962, and religious use continued for longer as it became a combined parish hall and Scout hut. In about 1996 it passed into secular use as a community hall and nursery school.	
Meadvale Methodist Church		Meadvale; 51.2274°N 0.1885°W	Methodist	L	This mid-19th-century chapel for Primitive Methodists has a marriage registration dating from December 1924. This was cancelled in December 2003, and the locally listed building is now a house.	
Jireh Strict Baptist Chapel (More images)		Meadvale; 51.2282°N 0.1889°W	Strict Baptist	–	This chapel was built in around 1854 "for the benefit of elderly people who found it difficult to get to [the Strict Baptist chapels at] Brockham Green or Lee Street [in Horley]". It soon became associated with Independent Calvinists and continued in use in that guise until the 1880s. After a long period of closure, it reopened as a Strict Baptist chapel in the late 1930s and was registered for marriages in November 1936. It later became the venue for the new Reigate Baptist Church, and closed when their new building in Woodhatch was registered in 2006.	
Canada Hall (More images)		Merstham; 51.2565°N 0.1508°W	Anglican	–	After All Saints Church in South Merstham was destroyed during World War II in a parachute mine explosion, Canadian soldiers who were staying locally helped to build a temporary replacement. Known ever since as Canada Hall, it served as an Anglican church until the new permanent church was built alongside. After that it became the church hall—but was later used for worship once again when it was offered to the Catholic Church as a temporary Mass venue before St Teresa's Church was built.	
Church of the Epiphany (More images)		Merstham; 51.2621°N 0.1417°W	Anglican	–	London County Council built a large council estate near Merstham railway station in the 1950s. Anglican services began in a house in November 1952, and a permanent church was founded on 11 June 1955. Its dedication as The Church of the Epiphany came on 4 February 1956. Subsidence was discovered in 2012 and was found to be too costly to repair, so it was announced that the building would close within three years. The last services were held in January 2015.	
Mugswell Mission		Mugswell; 51.2777°N 0.1966°W	Anglican	–	Mugswell is 2 miles (3.2 km) southwest of Chipstead, in whose parish it lies. A tiny wooden building was provided in about 1900 for use by Anglican worshippers who would otherwise have to travel to the parish church. Religious use continued until 1962 or later. Chipstead parish did not sell the building but have allowed it to become a village hall.	
Kingdom Hall (More images)		Reigate; 51.2421°N 0.2006°W	Jehovah's Witnesses	–	This building was registered between February 1960 and May 1995, since when the Reigate Congregations of Jehovah's Witnesses now use a new Kingdom Hall on the A217 road at Hookwood between Gatwick Airport and Reigate.	
Lesbourne Road Primitive Methodist Chapel (More images)		Reigate; 51.2339°N 0.2006°W	Methodist	L	This locally listed building was erected in 1870. It The London Gazette records the granting and cancelling of marriage licences in April 1924 and June 1948 respectively, and the chapel is now a warehouse.	
St Peter's Church (More images)		Woodhatch; 51.2213°N 0.1969°W	Anglican	–	This unusually designed building by E.F. Starling served the Woodhatch and Doversgreen housing estates in Reigate between 1955 and 2008. It was always part of the parish of St Luke's Church, South Park. The Diocese sold it in 2010.	

== Bibliography ==
- Chambers, Ralph (1952). The Strict Baptist Chapels of England: Surrey and Hampshire. Vol. 1. Thornton Heath: Ralph Chambers.
- Cleal, Edward E.; Crippen, T. G. (1908). The story of Congregationalism in Surrey. London: James Clarke & Co.
- Facey, Roy A., ed. (1981). International Church Index (Doctrinal). Index Publications. ISBN 0-907578-00-4.
- Hill, Roy (2002) [1990]. The Assemblies Address Book (PDF) (5th ed.). Bristol: Christian Year Publications. ISBN 1-872734-25-1. Archived from the original on 19 September 2004.
- Methodist Church of Great Britain (1947). Methodist Church Buildings: Statistical Returns including Seating Accommodation as at July 1st, 1940 (PDF). Manchester: The Department for Chapel Affairs. (Available online in 14 parts; Guide to abbreviations on page 6)
- Nairn, Ian; Pevsner, Nikolaus (1971) [1962]. The Buildings of England: Surrey (2nd ed.). Harmondsworth: Penguin Books. ISBN 0-300-09675-5.
- Stell, Christopher (2002). Nonconformist Chapels and Meeting-houses in Eastern England. Swindon: English Heritage. ISBN 1-873592-50-7.
- Stockwell, Arthur H., ed. (1909). The Baptist Churches of Surrey. London: Arthur Stockwell.
