= Margery =

Hamlet in Surrey, England

Coordinates: 51°15′40″N 0°12′22″W

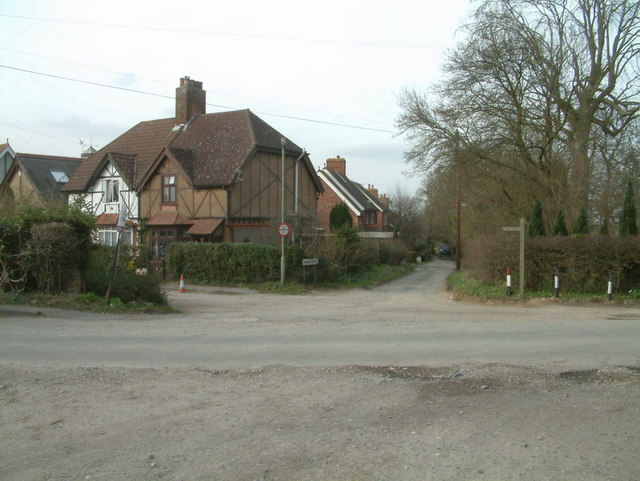
- The intersection between Manor Lane, Margery Lane and Mint Lane at the centre of the hamlet

- Location within Surrey
- Population: 420
- OS grid reference: TQ252528
- District: Reigate and Banstead
- Shire county: Surrey
- Region: South East
- Country: England
- Sovereign state: United Kingdom
- Post town: Tadworth
- Postcode district: KT20
- Dialling code: 01737
- Police: Surrey
- Fire: Surrey
- Ambulance: South East Coast
- UK Parliament: Reigate

Margery is a heavily buffered, lightly populated hamlet in the Reigate and Banstead district in the English county of Surrey. It sits on the North Downs, is bordered by the London Orbital Motorway, at a lower altitude, and its predominant land use is agriculture.

== History ==
This area was formerly very far from drinking water sources, being on Banstead Commons (also known as Banstead Downs), so it was a lightly laboured hill farming settlement. The history of its importance to the national economy is that of its feudal centre, Banstead, which gave much wealth to its lord of the manor, particularly to the King's consort, who had it exploited by tenant farmers for more than two centuries as part of its wide Commons/Downs, spanning here the widest part of the chalky, grassy North Downs. The high quality of the wool is shown by a petition of the Commons in 1454, in which they prayed that a sack of wool of the growth of Banstead Down might not be sold under £5 when the price of such wool was "greatly decayed". The reputation of Banstead Downs for sheep is referred to by Pope in the Imitations of Horace.

After the English Restoration, the Merland and Buckle families held the manor, removed to Nork House, which has become the suburb of Banstead simply known as Nork. This was until 1847 when in times of historically low wool prices, it was bought by the 4th Earl of Egmont.

In 1885, the Margery Mission Hall was set up by Reigate Congregational Church in the hamlet on Mint Lane. It is now a private residence.

== Geography ==
Margery is a heavily buffered hamlet in the Reigate and Banstead district, in the centre-north of Surrey, that is significantly elevated relative to most of the rest of the county and Greater London and around 1/2 mile (0.80 km) from the edge of the steep south-facing dip slope of the North Downs. The hamlet starts on the northern side of the M25 motorway, close to Junction 8, the Reigate Hill interchange, which accentuates in its cutting the dip slope of the North Downs.

The nearest settlement is the village of Lower Kingswood. Other nearby settlements include the towns of Reigate and Redhill, the small hamlet of Mogador, and the villages of Kingswood, Tadworth and Walton-on-the-Hill. The area surrounding the hamlet is a mixture of farmland and common land. To the south is Reigate Hill, contiguous with Colley Hill, which is National Trust land. Other common land areas nearby include Banstead Heath, Walton Heath and the Buckland Hills. The North Downs Way passes immediately to the south of the hamlet (on the other side of the motorway).

== Demography ==
Its population is almost wholly the population recorded in United Kingdom Census 2011 output area E00156016.

2011 Census Key Statistics
Output area	Population	Households	% Owned outright	% Owned with a loan
E00156016	420	168	35.1	45.8

== Governance ==
In local government (as in ecclesiastical parish in the Church of England), the area is part of a unit with Lower Kingswood, taking precedence in name.

See Kingswood, Surrey, Lower Kingswood is (counter-intuitively) higher than Upper Kingswood.

In Surrey County Council, the electoral division is that of Merstham and Banstead South
