= Meadvale =

Suburb in Surrey, England

Coordinates: 51.22721°N 0.18707°W

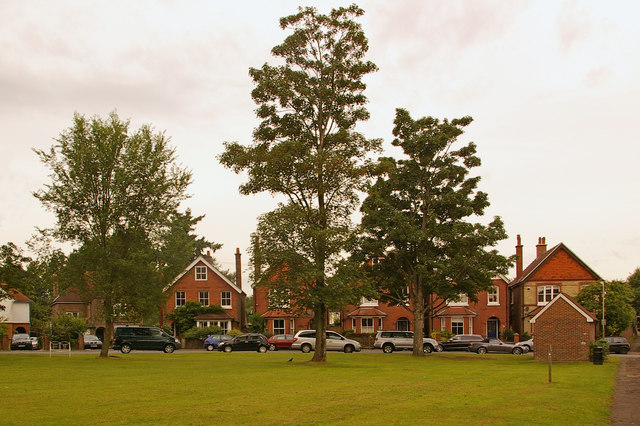
- A central green-buffered estate of Meadvale

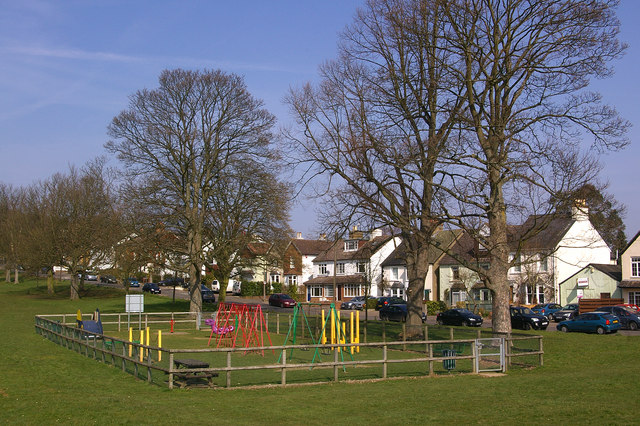
- Earlswood Common is a park of similar size to Meadvale, adjoining it to the south and includes play areas and Redhill and Reigate Golf Course.

- Location within Surrey
- Population: 3,090 2011 Census
- OS grid reference: TQ267491
- District: Reigate and Banstead
- Shire county: Surrey
- Region: South East
- Country: England
- Sovereign state: United Kingdom
- Post town: REDHILL; REIGATE
- Postcode district: RH1; RH2
- Dialling code: 01737
- Police: Surrey
- Fire: Surrey
- Ambulance: South East Coast
- UK Parliament: Reigate

Meadvale or less commonly Mead Vale is a southern residential suburb that straddles borders of Redhill and Reigate in the borough of Reigate and Banstead in Surrey, and one of two which do so. The average elevation of the district is higher than the centres of each of the towns – Meadvale is bisected east-west by the Greensand Way at the top of a moderately low section of the Greensand Ridge. Its population, as broadly defined on its ward definition, is 3,090 spread over 64 hectares (160 acres) based upon the most recent national census.

== Geography ==
Meadvale is contiguous with the 'town centre' of Reigate and Linkfield or Linkfield Street which is mostly part of Redhill and the only other suburb shared between the two post towns. Meadvale has the Greensand Way, a path cutting through its centre on a low, lightly wooded stretch of the Greensand Ridge. The ridge spans most of Kent and all of Surrey and is quite steep, e.g. reaching Leith Hill, and (until the 19th century) traditionally having no villages on its crest, it is relatively densely and using many listed buildings built upon at St John's, Redhill directly east of the suburb.

The traditional heart of the suburb is to the south, where for instance, Palmer lived, and within the Redhill rather than the Reigate post town. On the other hand, in economics and leisure apart than the considerable facilities of adjoining Earlswood Common park, the nearby major town centre is Reigate, which adjoins the northern half.

Elevations range from 132m above sea level in the centre to 72m on the southern border, a road that demarcates Earlswood Common, a large open space.

== Demography ==
The United Kingdom Census 2011 considered the suburb as output layers 'Reigate and Banstead 012C and 013B', i.e. north and south parts, approximately half of the ward Meadvale and South Park, the latter being an area of Reigate to the south-west. The halves of Meadvale were considerably less densely populated, with larger single family homes with gardens, towards the highest area, the central east-west belt of the district than their lowest north and south borders.

The proportion of households in Meadvale who owned their home outright was within 2% of the borough and regional average. The proportion who owned their home with a loan was 17% and 6.2% greater respectively than the regional average; providing overall in each area for a lower proportion than average of rented residential property and of social housing, and close to the average in Surrey.

2011 Census Key Statistics
Output area	Population	Households	% Owned outright	% Owned with a loan	hectares
Reigate & Banstead 012C	1,592	616	33.3	52.1	42
Reigate & Banstead 013B	1,498	603	36.3	41.3	22

== History ==
Post-Norman Conquest land use

The developed history of the area is that of Redhill until the 19th century. All of this area was in the first of its three parishes: much of large, non-borough status 'Reigate Foreign' as opposed to adjoining bustling, (even before 1832) urban Reigate (Parliamentary) Borough, coupled with to the north outcrops of Gatton and Merstham which were until the 20th century sparsely inhabited villages. Of relevance to political and social history, Gatton was a borough too but a rotten borough, meaning it suffered from severe malapportionment until it was abolished in 1832. These remain rural and arguably suburban respectively north of the twin towns.

Development as a brickfields town, coach town, market town and commuter settlement

By the late 19th century, Reigate Foreign's own community and incoming migrants had developed six relatively densely inhabited pockets of housing: 'Linkfield Street', Hooley, 'Wiggy', 'Little London', 'Warwick Town' and Meadvale, particularly as compared that is to much of the surrounding fields and woodland. Beside Redhill railway station (named only after the nearest common land) neatly placed by the early 19th century redirected London-Brighton Road a recognisable, market town-style High Street had developed by approximately 1880, four decades after that station was built, but still termed Warwick Town commonly on maps and in official records. These combined 'hub' factors led to a railway junction town and staging town of considerable size, attracting new local industries. Particularly, brickfields for London, provided major employment.

Social and economic features within Meadvale

Meadvale was known in the 19th century as Meads Hole. The name means meadowland hollow. Here not only dwellings but also pottery businesses scattered over the common land – some kilns remain. The major hamlet had two butchers, a baker, a draper, a tailor and a grocer's shop. The first school was held in the village hall with a fee of one penny a week for each child. At the beginning of the 19th century, there was a tanner's yard adjoining Earlswood Common which was pasture, not park, at the southern entrance to Meadvale.

20th century history

The development expanded, spurred by demand stimulated by the rise in professions in London, of trade, building and manufacturing across the county and particularly catering to fewer brickfields workers, leaving Edwardian architecture one of the enduring types of building. In this centre planning policies and decisions were made by the Borough of Reigate, followed by Reigate and Banstead Borough Council. A string of bombs was dropped on the area during the Blitz of World War II causing injury and destruction to a minority of properties.

=== Notable people ===
The painter Samuel Palmer lived his later working years, when he painted Surrey principally, in Meadvale at the Chantry on Cronks Hill Road until his death in 1881.

== See also ==
- List of places of worship in Reigate and Banstead
