= Mogador, Surrey =

Hamlet in Surrey, England

Coordinates: 51.2617°N 0.2249°W

Mogador
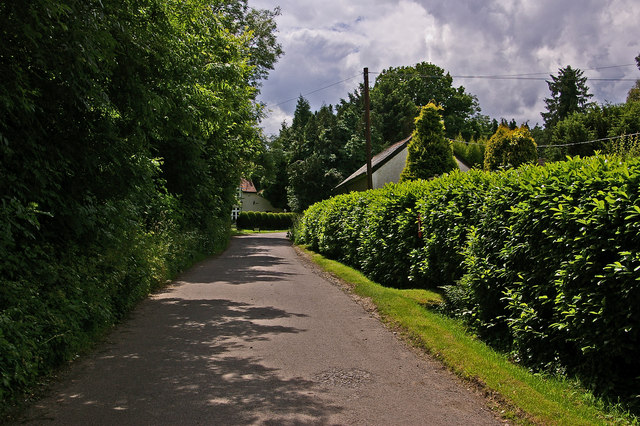

- Location within Surrey
- District: Reigate and Banstead
- Shire county: Surrey
- Region: South East
- Country: England
- Sovereign state: United Kingdom
- Police: Surrey
- Fire: Surrey
- Ambulance: South East Coast

Mogador is a hamlet in the Reigate and Banstead district, in the county of Surrey, England. It is at the edge of Banstead Heath, which provides it a green buffer from other communities, and about 1/2 mile (0.8 km) from the top of the north-facing dip slope of the North Downs. At an elevation of about 200 metres (660 ft) it is one of the highest settlements in south-east England. It is just north of the M25 motorway.

The nearest settlement is Lower Kingswood, through which Mogador is accessed by road. Other nearby settlements include the hamlet of Margery, the villages of Kingswood, Tadworth and Walton-on-the-Hill, and the town of Reigate. The area surrounding the hamlet is a mixture of farmland and common land, with Colley Hill and Reigate Hill to the south and east being National Trust land. Other common land areas nearby include Walton Heath and the Buckland Hills. The North Downs Way passes immediately to the south of the hamlet.

The hamlet gave its name to the telephone exchange which provides the service to Lower Kingswood and most of Kingswood, now included in the 01737 area code.

Located here is The Sportsman pub. This is said to be one of Henry VIII's hunting lodges.

== Name ==
Mogador takes its name from the family name of Richard Maggot, a local landowner in the fifteenth century, combined with haw, an enclosed piece of land. By 1618 this had developed into Maggothaw, before gradually mutating into its present form.

== Transport ==
Road

The closest junction of the M25 is Junction 8, Reigate Hill, just 1 mile (1.6 km) east, for the A217 and A240.

Rail

The nearest station, Kingswood, is 3 miles (4.8 km) north.
