= Lake Mercer =

Lake Mercer may refer to:

- Grand Lake in Grand Lake St. Marys State Park, Mercer county
- Mercer Lake in Mercer County Park, New Jersey
- Mercer Lake (Antarctica), a subglacial lake in Antarctica
- Mercers Lake, a lake used for water sports in Surrey, UK
