= Portal frame =

Construction technique

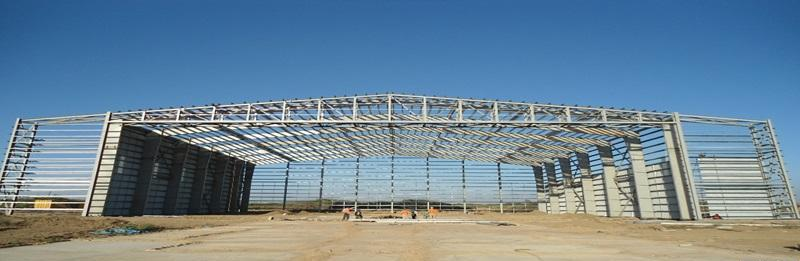
A portal frame steel building under construction

Portal frame is a construction technique where vertical supports are connected to horizontal beams or trusses via fixed joints with designed-in moment-resisting capacity. The result is wide spans and open floors.

Portal frame structures can be constructed using a variety of materials and methods. These include steel, reinforced concrete and laminated timber such as glulam. First developed in the 1960s, they have become the most common form of enclosure for spans of 20 to 60 meters.

Because of these very strong and rigid joints, some of the bending moment in the rafters is transferred to the columns. This means that the size of the rafters can be reduced or the span can be increased for the same size rafters. This makes portal frames a very efficient construction technique to use for wide span buildings.

Portal frame construction is therefore typically seen in warehouses, barns and other places where large, open spaces are required at low cost and a pitched roof is acceptable.

Generally portal frames are used for single-story buildings but they can be used for low-rise buildings with several floors where they can be economic if the floors do not span right across the building (in these circumstances a skeleton frame, with internal columns, would be a more economic choice). A typical configuration might be where there is office space built against one wall of a warehouse.

Portal frames can be clad with various materials. For reasons of economy and speed, the most popular solution is some form of lightweight insulated metal cladding with cavity masonry work to the bottom 2 m of the wall to provide security and impact resistance. The lightweight cladding would be carried on sheeting rails spanning between the columns of the portal frames.

Portal frames can be defined as two-dimensional rigid frames that have the basic characteristics of a rigid joint between column and beam.

The main objective of this form of design is to reduce bending moment in the beam, which allows the frame to act as one structural unit.

The transfer of stresses from the beam to the column results in rotational movement at the foundation, which can be overcome by the introduction of a pin/hinge joint.

For warehouses and industrial buildings, sloping roof made of purlins and ac sheet roofing between portals is provided. For assembly halls, portals with R.C slab roof cast monolithically is used.

Portal frames are designed for the following loads:

- roof load
- wind load

Previously, it has been shown that the limit state design/load and resistance factor design (LRFD) and permissible stress design/allowable strength design (ASD) can produce significantly different designs of steel gable frames.

There are few situations where ASD produces significantly lighter weight steel gable frame designs. Additionally, it has been shown that in high snow regions, the difference between the methods is more dramatic.

While designing, care should be taken for proper

- joints
- foundation
- bracing

If the joints are not rigid, they will "open up" and the frame will be unstable when subjected to loads. This is the pack of cards effect.

1. Vertical loading results in the walls being pushed outwards. If the foundation cannot resist horizontal push, outward movement will occur and the frame will lose strength.
2. Wind subjects the frame to uplift forces. Overturning forces on the sides and ends of the building. Drag forces on the roof and sides.
3. These destabilizing forces are resisted essentially by the weight of the building and in this regard, the foundations contribute significantly to this weight. The foundations are regarded as the building's anchors.
