= Mercers Lake =

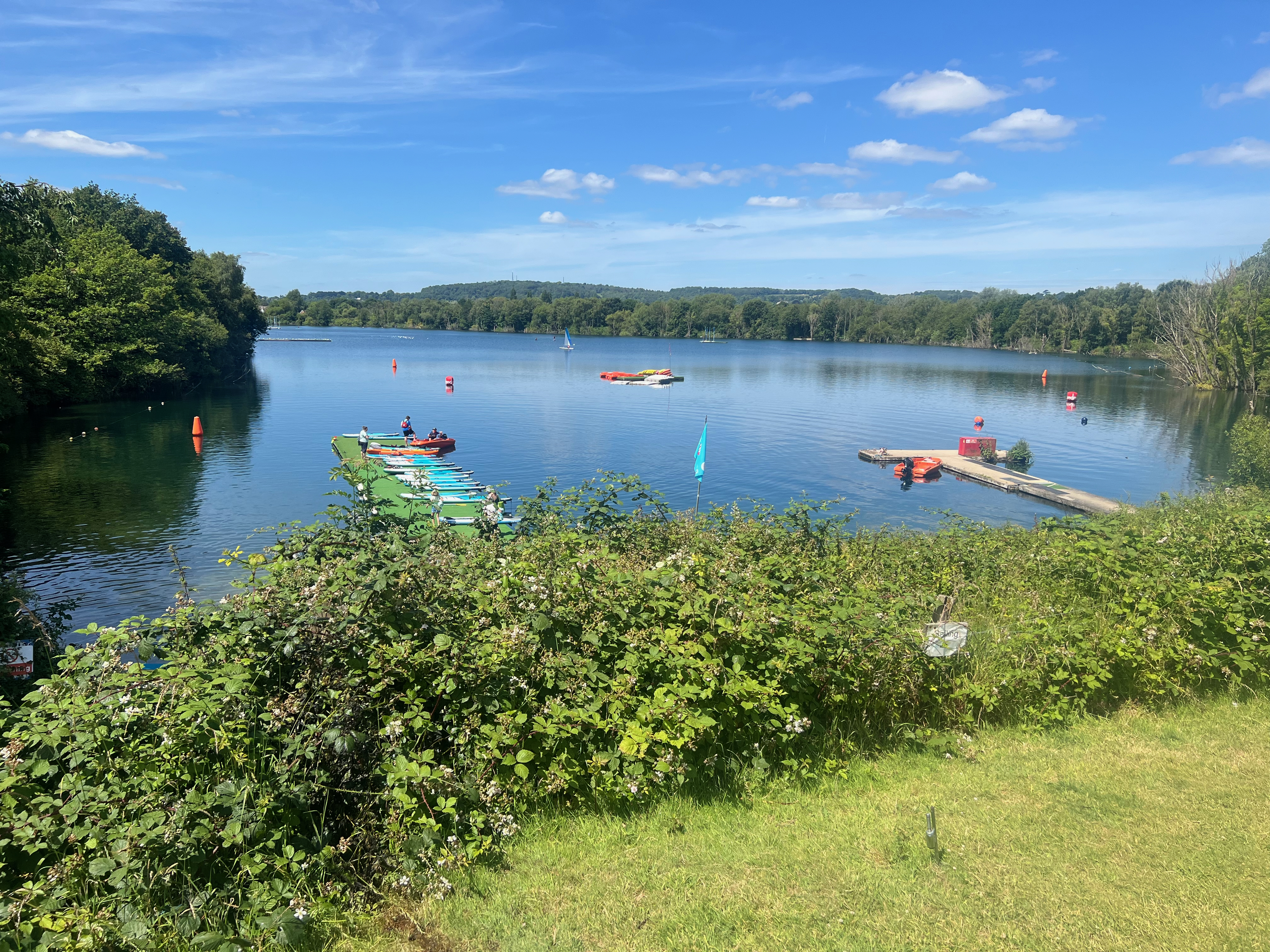
- View looking west from the cafe

- Location in Surrey
- Location: Merstham, Surrey, UK
- Coordinates: 51.2514°N 0.1412°W
- Type: Lake
- Basin countries: United Kingdom
- Average depth: 8 metres (26 ft)
- Max. depth: 15 metres (49 ft)

Mercers Lake is a body of water in Mercers Park, Merstham, near Redhill, Surrey. It is a former quarry that has been adapted for water sports, such as sailing, kayaking, and paddle boarding.

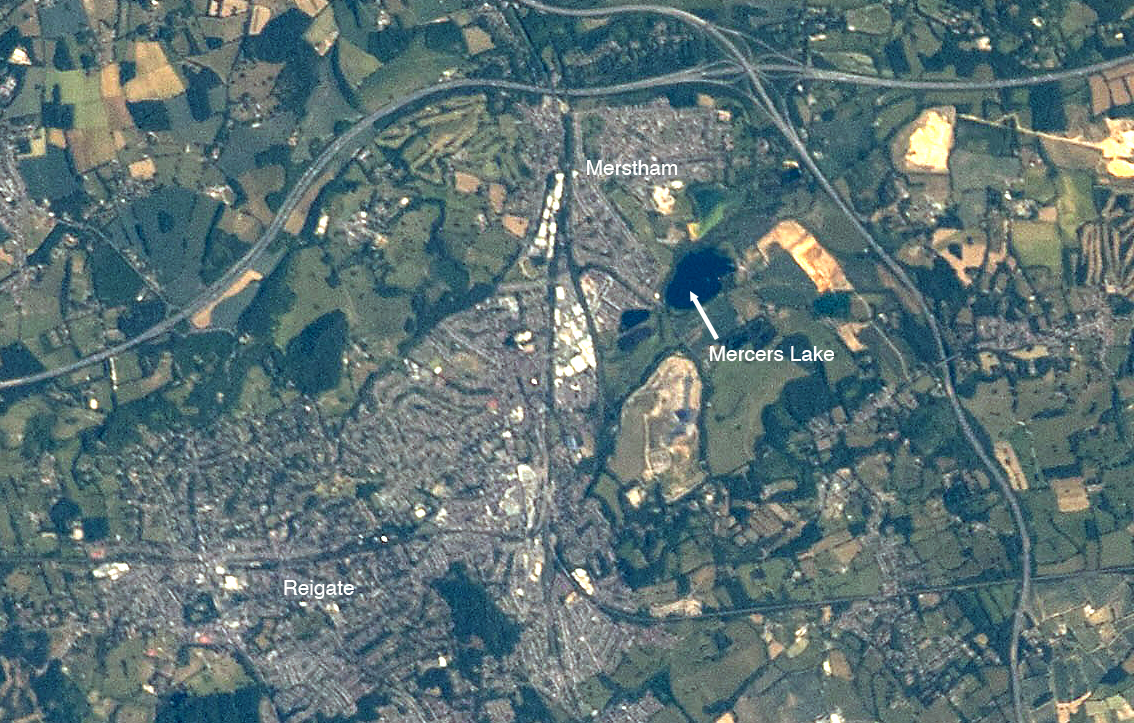
Annotated image showing Mercers Lake from the International Space Station - originally from NASA ISS067-E-147051

== History ==
The lake was originally a sand quarry created by British Industrial Sands.

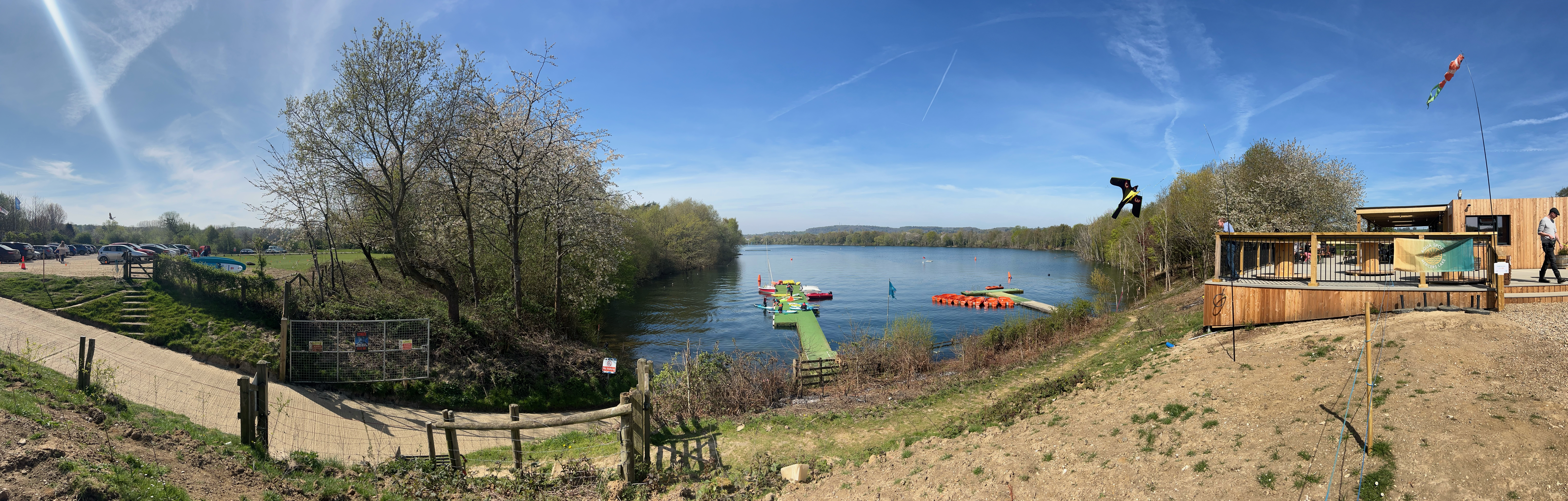
Mercers Country Park Lake by the water sports café.

The water sports centre was expanded to a larger cafe and adventure playground in early 2025.

== Activities ==
The lake is used for fishing and contains perch, bream, pike, and large carp.

The lake is also used for scuba diving courses by Oyster Diving, a PADI Dive Centre. There are facilities for setting up equipment, hiring equipment and having guided dives. The lake is up to 15 m deep, and contains the remains of the front of a Cessna plane, other sunken attractions and an underwater forest.

== Accidents and incidents ==
A 31-year-old man named Edward Savage drowned in the lake in June 2018. Local police had received a number of calls about youths swimming in the lake earlier in the week. The death was not connected to the company who run water sports there.

In 2023 a swan was killed with a brick, following a similar incident in 2022, where a swan was shot with a ball bearing.
