= Merstham =

Town in Surrey, England

Coordinates: 51.264°N 0.153°W

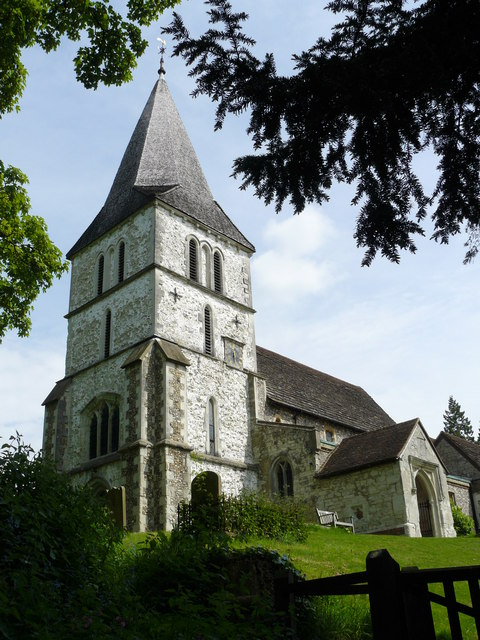
- St Katharine's Church

- Location within Surrey
- Area: 9.38 km^{2} (3.62 sq mi)
- Population: 8,123 (2011 census)
  - Density: 866/km^{2} (2,240/sq mi)
- OS grid reference: TQ295535
- Civil parish: n/a
- District: Reigate and Banstead
- Shire county: Surrey
- Region: South East
- Country: England
- Sovereign state: United Kingdom
- Post town: Redhill
- Postcode district: RH1
- Dialling code: 01737
- Police: Surrey
- Fire: Surrey
- Ambulance: South East Coast
- UK Parliament: East Surrey

Merstham /ˈmɜːrstəm/ is a town in the borough of Reigate and Banstead in Surrey, England. It lies 17 miles south of Charing Cross just beyond the Greater London border. Part of the North Downs Way runs along the northern boundary of the town. Merstham has community associations, an early medieval church and a football club.

== Neighbourhoods ==
=== Old Merstham ===
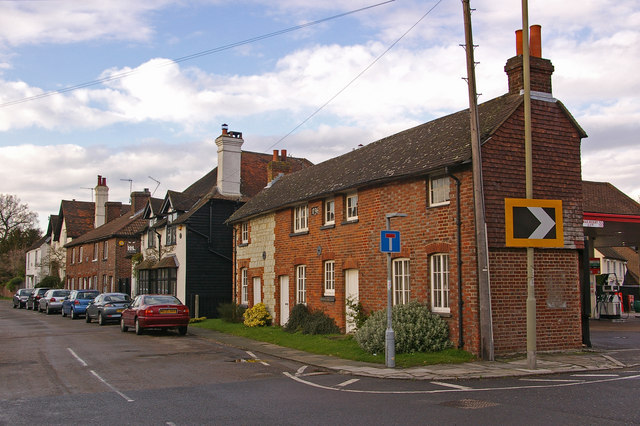
Old Merstham

Old Merstham forms the north and north-west of modern Merstham and is the original village centre. There is a small day school by the railway station, a pub, a few barbershops and a small number of other shops.

=== The Merstham Estate/New Merstham ===
After World War II the London County Council built the Merstham Estate, originally entirely public housing, to a geometric layout in the eastern fields. This area has its own parade of shops, the Brook recreation ground, three schools, and a youth/community centre along Radstock Way. Oakley, a small country house, is listed and has Victorian gothic architecture features.

=== South Merstham ===
South Merstham is made up of mainly Victorian and Edwardian terraces. It provided a workforce for Albury Manor and nearby chalk quarrying and brickworking. Nutfield Road has a long parade of shops.

South Merstham is home to Connevans Limited, who, in April 2016 became holders of the Royal Warrant, by Appointment to Her Majesty Queen Elizabeth II Supplier and Manufacturer of Audio Equipment.

== History ==
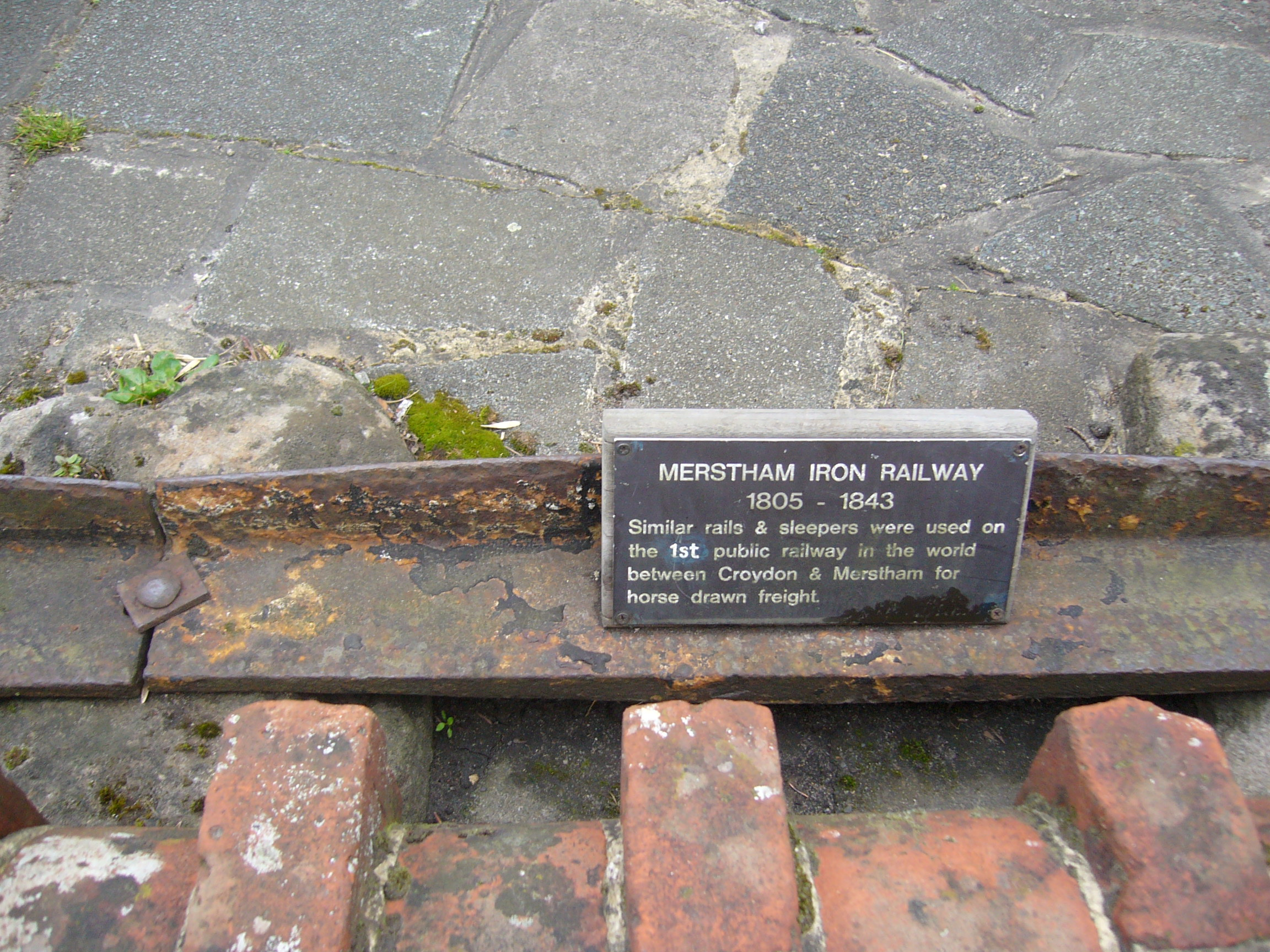
A piece of the Croydon, Merstham and Godstone Railway near Quality Street

The area has been settled since pre-Roman times.

The village lay within the Reigate hundred, an Anglo-Saxon administrative division. Its name was recorded in 947 as Mearsætham, which seems to be Anglo-Saxon Mearþ-sǣt-hām = "Homestead near a trap set for martens or weasels".

The Anglo-Saxon Chronicle for 851 states that a Viking army 'went south over the Thames into Surrey; and King Aethelwulf and his son Aethelbald with the West Saxon army fought against them at Aclea, and there made the greatest slaughter of a heathen raiding-army that we have heard tell of up to the present day, and there took the victory.' According to Stenton, the name Aclea nearly always appears in modern times as 'Oakley'. There is an Oakley in Merstham close to 'Old Way' prehistoric trackway. There is also a Battlebridge Lane in Merstham. The identification of the battle of Aclea with the site at Oakley in Merstham rather than Ockley in Surrey was in an article published in the Surrey Archaeological Collection for 1912.

Merstham appears in Domesday Book of 1086 as Merstan. It was held by Archbishop Lanfranc of Canterbury. Its domesday assets were: 5 hides; 1 church, 1 mill worth 2s 6d, 10 ploughs, 8 acres (3.2 ha) of meadow, woodland and herbage worth 41 hogs. It rendered £12.

The area has long been known for its quarries, with the first mines at Merstham recorded in the Domesday Book of 1086, and 'Reigate stone' quarried there used to build parts of Westminster Abbey, Windsor Castle and Henry VIII's Nonsuch Palace. It was to serve the quarries that the village became the terminus of the Croydon, Merstham and Godstone Railway, an extension of the horse-drawn Surrey Iron Railway of 1803, the world's first public railway, albeit only for goods. A small section of the railway is on display at the entrance to Quality Street, Old Merstham. Unfortunately, this section has now been taken.

Mercers Lake was a former sand quarry, and is now used for water sports and fishing.

The use of dynamite was first publicly demonstrated by Alfred Nobel in Price's Grey-lime Stone chalk quarry in July 1868. The site is now partly covered by the route of the M23 motorway just east of where it passes under the Shepherd's Hill bridge.

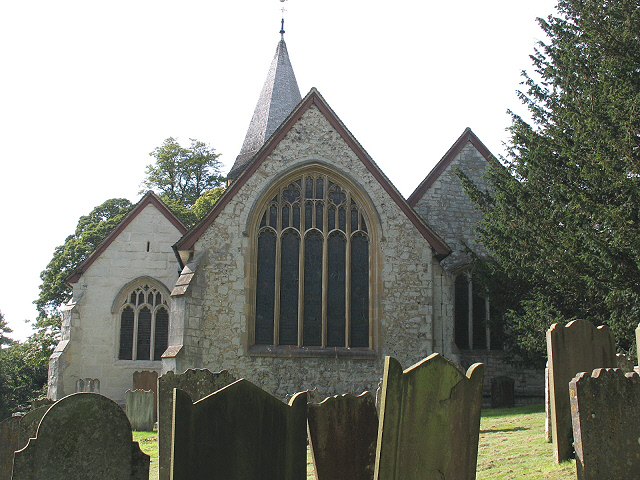
The east end of the church

The original parish church, St Katharine's, dates from around 1220; it replaced an earlier church built c. 1100, although it is believed there has been a church of some form on the site since c. 675 AD.

Merstham's conservation area is centred on its High Street which winds in the village centre to the northwest, forms part of the A23 road and includes many listed buildings; the street with the greatest number, Quality Street, arcs off at a tangent from this curve of the High Street. This was named after J.M. Barrie's play of the same name, in honour of two of the actors in the play, Ellaline Terriss and Seymour Hicks, who for a time lived in the Old Forge at the end of the street. 1 High Street partly dates to the 17th century.

The earlier of the two Merstham railway tunnels was the scene of a murder on 24 September 1905. The mutilated body of Mary Sophia Money was found in the tunnel and was first thought to be a case of suicide. On inspection, however, a scarf was found in the victim's throat, and marks on the tunnel wall showed that she had been thrown from a moving train. The crime was never solved, but suspicion rested on her brother, Robert Money.

In 1943 a petroleum pipeline was constructed from the Thames through to Dungeness (designated the T/D pipeline) to supply fuel to the PLUTO cross-channel pipelines that were to run from Dungeness to Boulogne, code named DUMBO. A section of the T/D pipeline ran through Merstham and the T/D was part of the then secret government pipeline network later known as the Government Pipeline and Storage System (GPSS).

After World War II, the Merstham Estate was gradually built over a period spanning to the early 1970s.

The old village thus became generally known as Old Merstham, and is occasionally known as Top Merstham.

Rockshaw Road, on the hilltop above the conservation area of Old Merstham, was developed at the very end of the 19th century, and between the World Wars was home to many nationally notable people, among them senior Army and Navy figures, financiers and politicians.

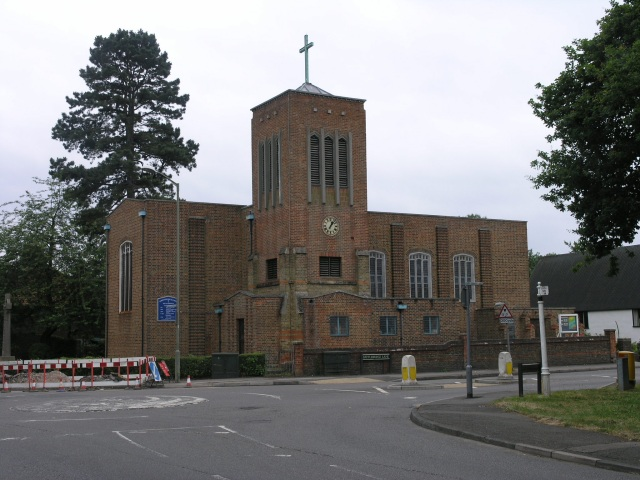
All Saints' Church

At the junction of Battlebridge Lane and Nutfield Road is All Saints' church, the original building of which was destroyed in World War II. Volunteers from the Canadian Army worked to build a temporary church for the village, which became known as Canada Hall and is used as a village hall and weekly meeting hall for some Merstham branches of the Girl Guides.

In 1951 the civil parish had a population of 3568. On 1 April 1974 the parish was abolished.

=== Historic estates ===
The parish of Merstham contains various historic estates including:

- Withyshaw, in 1937 the seat of a junior branch of the Passmore family, which originated before the 15th century at Passmore Hayes near Tiverton in Devon.

== Transport ==
London Buses run to Croydon, Coulsdon, Purley and Redhill town centre. Metrobus operates buses to Reigate, Caterham and Warlingham.

The village is served by Merstham railway station on the Brighton Main Line, with services to London Bridge, London Victoria and Gatwick Airport.

== Demography and housing ==
2011 Census homes
Ward	Detached	Semi-detached	Terraced	Flats and apartments	Caravans/temporary/mobile homes/houseboats	Shared between households
Merstham	549	955	970	744	2	5

The average level of accommodation in the region composed of detached houses was 28%, the average that was apartments was 22.6%.

2011 Census households
Ward	Population	Households	% Owned outright	% Owned with a loan	hectares
Merstham	8,123	3,225	26	38	938

The proportion of households who owned their home outright compares to the regional average of 35.1%. The proportion who owned their home with a loan compares to the regional average of 32.5%. The remaining % is made up of rented dwellings (plus a negligible % of households living rent-free).

== Sport and leisure ==
Merstham has a non-League football club, Merstham F.C., which plays at the Moatside. It also has a cricket club which plays in Fullers league division two.

Merstham Mines, an abandoned mine, is a popular caving destination.

== Notable residents ==
- John Anderson, Viscount Waverley (1882–1958), civil servant and politician, owned a house in Rockshaw Road 1938–1945, although he mainly lived in central London.
- Henry, Lord Benson (1909–1995), accountant, partner of Coopers & Lybrand and president of Institute of Chartered Accountants lived here from circa 1950 to the 1970s.
- General Sir Walter Campbell (1864–1936), Quartermaster-General to the Forces, lived in Rockshaw Road from 1925 until his death in 1936.
- Seymour Hicks (1871–1949) and his wife Ellaline Terriss (1871–1971), stage actors, lived in the Old Forge in Quality Street prior to the First World War.
- Keble Howard, pen name of John Keble Bell, (1875–1928), writer and journalist, lived in Rockshaw Road from 1912 to 1920.
- Sir Geoffrey Howe (1926–2015), Conservative politician and MP for Reigate, then East Surrey, lived here from 1973–74.
- Sir Harold Webbe (1885–1965), member of the London County Council, then MP for Westminster Abbey, lived here from 1928 until his death in 1965.

== See also ==
- List of places of worship in Reigate and Banstead
