= Colley Hill =

Hill in Surrey, England

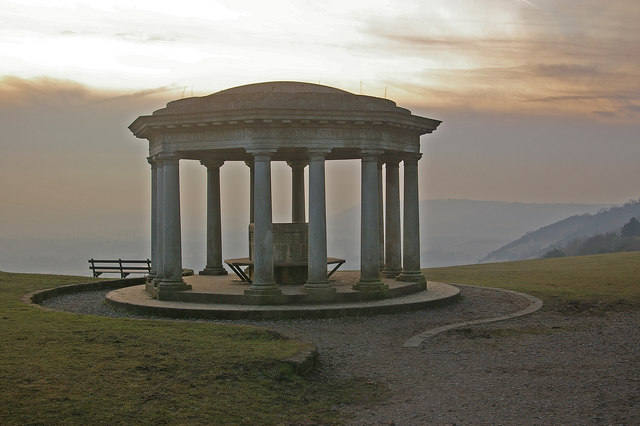
- The Inglis Memorial. Dating from 1909, it was originally a drinking fountain for horses.

Highest point
- Elevation: 722 ft (220 m)
- Coordinates: 51°15′23″N 0°13′7″W

Geography
- Location within Surrey
- Parent range: North Downs

Colley Hill is part of the North Downs escarpment in the North Downs, Surrey, England. It is about 1 km east of Buckland Hills and 1 km west of Reigate Hill, all of which form part of the same escarpment. It is centred 30 kilometres (19 mi) south of London and forms a single scarp with Reigate Hill, peaking 2 miles (3 km) away at 235 metres above sea level. The scarp fluctuates in height but is continuous as far as Box Hill 5 miles (8 km) west. The term "Reigate Hill" also designates a neighbourhood of Reigate, and also a ward of Reigate and Banstead.

== Prominence and description of section of range ==
Colley Hill is contiguous with Reigate Hill, the ninth highest hill in Surrey. Colley Hill is its western continuation — officially considered a crest or scarp reaching (at grid reference TQ255521) 771 feet (235 m), a point usually simply but confusingly known as Reigate Hill. "Reigate Hill" also defines a neighbourhood of the town of Reigate, and is also a ward of Reigate and Banstead. The Reigate Hill summit is the highest point along the Mole Gap to Merstham Gap, the mid-western section of the North Downs, which stretch from at least Farnham in the west to Dover on the coast.

This section of the ridge is, as is typical, steep and a little to the west is quarried forming white faces to the south but particularly gentle to the north, where it gave way to hill pasture covering more than 10 square miles (26 km^{2}) which was until deep wells were dug devoid of any access to surface water, known as Banstead and Walton Downs.

At the foot of Colley Hill are the remains of the Hearthstone Mine, where they mined a seam of hearthstone that ran from Brockham Pit to Caterham. Hearthstone was used to clean hearths and doorsteps. The main tunnel headed due north under the hill and was 1.8m wide and nearly 1.5m high. The mine was worked from the late 1890s and included its own processing works, where the blocks of stone were crushed before being mixed with cement and moulded. The hearthstone would then be taken by horse and cart to a railway siding where it was transported to London. A V-1 flying bomb destroyed some buildings in 1944. The mine was eventually closed in 1961 and the entrance blocked.

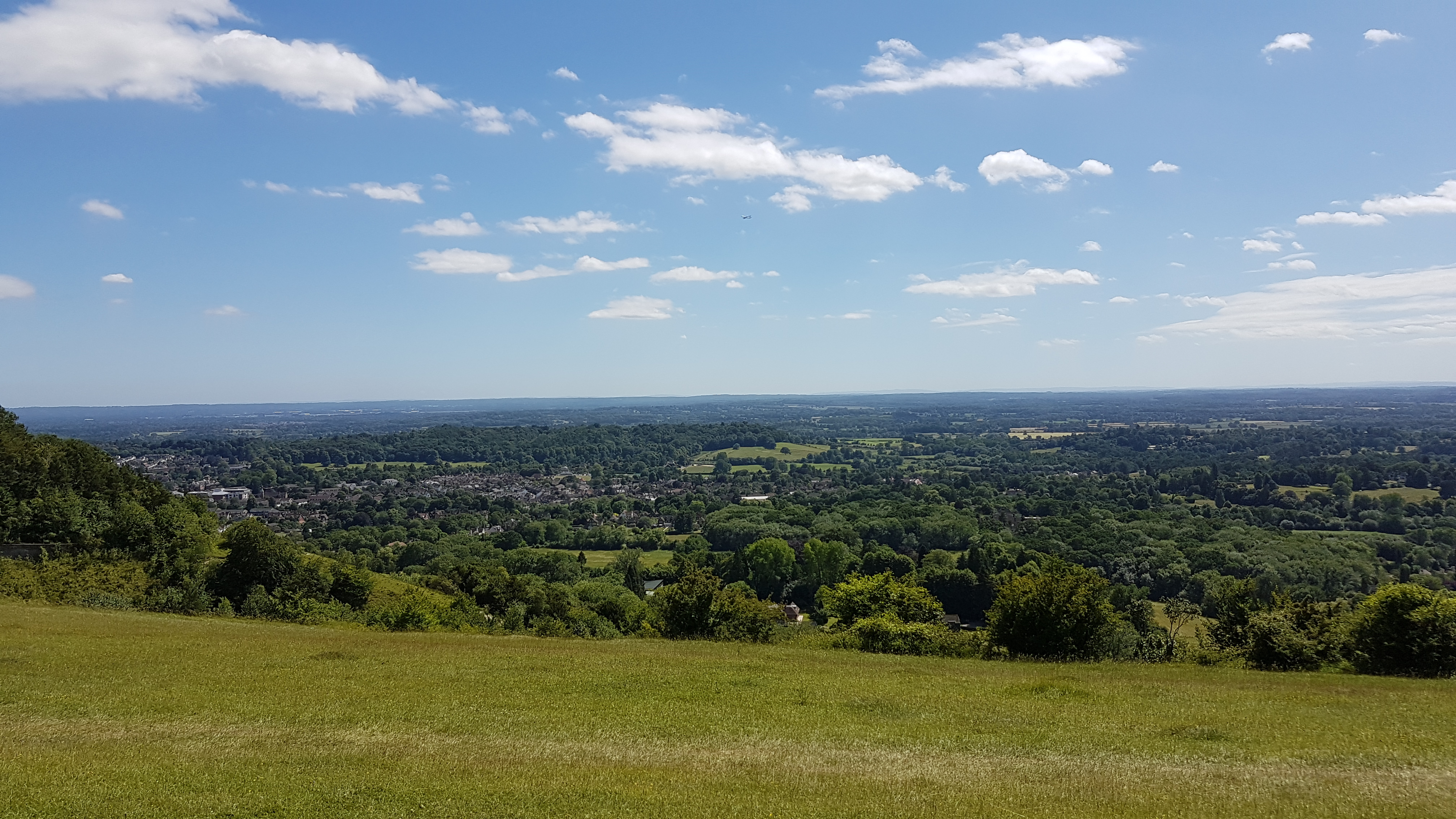
View of Surrey and Sussex Weald from Colley Hill

== Wider context ==
The lower summit is noted for even greater biodiversity along the same Site of Special Scientific Interest (SSSI) at Box Hill which first came to stark national public attention in the 18th century due to its access to London and greater prominence above the steep valley cut by the Mole below, particularly in novels such as Emma and having views over the country seat of especially wealthy individuals at Polesden Lacey, Deepdene House, Norbury Park and being on the same ridge as Headley Court served to cement its 'prominence'.

The Pilgrims' Way travels along the scarp at these points though below it at Box Hill, a café with terrace is at the summit of Reigate Hill (in a car park near Junction 8 of the M25) and nearby villages also provide facilities for walkers, such as Buckland to the immediate south-west.
