= Redhill, Surrey =

Town in Surrey, England

Coordinates: 51.2393°N 0.1726°W

Redhill
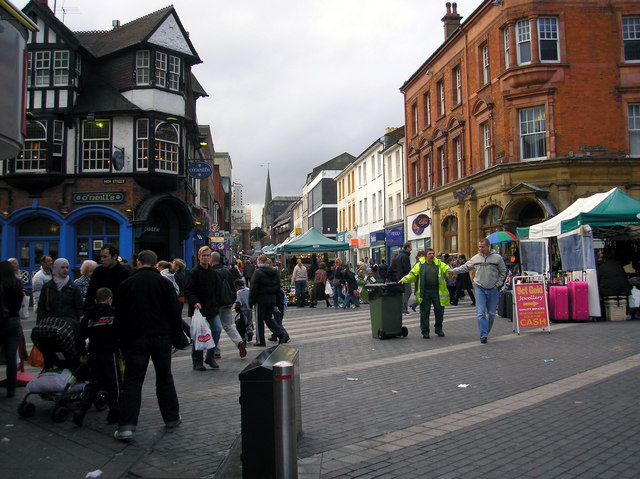
- Station Road, Redhill

- Location within Surrey
- Area: 5.66 km^{2} (2.19 sq mi)
- Population: 18,163 (2011); 34,498 (built-up area including Merstham)
  - Density: 3,209/km^{2} (8,310/sq mi)
- OS grid reference: TQ275505
  - London: 19.5 miles (31.4 km)
- District: Reigate and Banstead
- Shire county: Surrey
- Region: South East
- Country: England
- Sovereign state: United Kingdom
- Post town: REDHILL
- Postcode district: RH1
- Dialling code: 01737
- Police: Surrey
- Fire: Surrey
- Ambulance: South East Coast
- UK Parliament: Reigate

Redhill (/ˈrɛdhɪl/) is a town in the borough of Reigate and Banstead within the county of Surrey, England. The town, which adjoins the town of Reigate to the west, is due south of Croydon in Greater London, and is part of the London commuter belt. The town is also the post town, entertainment and commercial area of three adjoining communities: Earlswood, Merstham and Whitebushes, as well as of two small rural villages to the east in the Tandridge District, Bletchingley and Nutfield.

The town is situated on the junction of the north–south A23 (London to Brighton) road, and the east–west A25 road which runs from Guildford through to Sevenoaks. It is also on the railway junction, served by Redhill railway station, of the Brighton Main Line, North-Downs line, and Redhill-Tonbridge line.

== Geography ==
Redhill is located within the Weald Basin, and the Weald-Artois Anticline. The town is situated in the east–west lying Vale of Holmesdale at a place where there is a natural water-cut gap in the Greensand Ridge, which connects the town with the low-lying land of the Low Weald to the south. Today the Redhill Brook runs through the gap in the Greensand Ridge on its way to join the Salfords Stream and the River Mole to the south. (The brook is now mainly culverted through the town centre: it enters a culvert behind Redhill station and briefly reappears in town at the Halford's car park, before emerging as a free-running stream again in Earlswood). The gap through the Greensand Ridge provides a way south for the London to Brighton railway and the A23 road. Gatwick Airport is also nearby 7 miles south of the town. The housing of the town is built in the Vale of Holmesdale, and on the hillsides of the two ends of the Greensand Ridge (Redstone Hill and the hillside of Redhill Common), and on the flat of the water-cut gap in between.

To the north, the town joins with the village of Merstham, north of which there is a "wind gap" in the chalk hills of the North Downs, at an elevation of 120 metres (390 feet) above sea level, through which the A23 road heads in from London. Geologists have speculated that there may once have been a consequent-flowing river, flowing northwards from the centre of the Weald-Artois Anticline and towards the River Thames, which originally cut both the Redhill Gap in the Greensand Ridge and the Merstham Gap in the chalk hills of the North Downs, before its waters were caught by subsequent streams of the River Mole (which itself cuts gaps northwards through the ridge at Betchworth, and through the Downs at Dorking, on its way to the Thames). Today the whole Redhill area is part of the catchment area of the River Mole, and hence the Thames.

The east–west running road the A25, approaches Redhill from the east along the elevated Greensand Ridge from Nutfield, and proceeds westward from Redhill along the Vale of Holmesdale towards Reigate and Dorking.

To the immediate north-east of the town are The Moors nature reserve and the large 2010–2012 (mid and low-rise) Watercolour housing development, comprising 25 acres (10 hectares) of lakes, paths and wildlife habitat managed by the Surrey Wildlife Trust.

Redhill is one of the few places in the UK where fuller's earth can be extracted, though production ceased in 2000. Sand used to be mined from a quarry in what is now Mercers Lake in Merstham.

== History ==
A settlement was formed here in part of the rural parishes of Reigate Foreign and Merstham when a turnpike road was built in 1818. The London-Brighton road passed through the Merstham Gap in the North Downs, and the Redhill Gap in the Greensand Ridge. The settlement was originally known as "Warwick Town" after Warwick Road, and became known as Redhill when the post office moved from Red Hill Common in the south-west of the town in 1856.

A major factor in the development of the town was the coming of the railways. The gap through the Greensand Ridge at Redhill was a major advantage for routing a railway from London to Brighton. A railway station opened in Redhill on 12 July 1841, after the London and Brighton Railway created a rail line by excavating the first of two rail tunnels under the North Downs at Merstham. Another railway station at Redhill followed on 26 May 1842, located on the South Eastern Railway's London to Dover to line, which branched off the original line south of the Merstham tunnel. Then on 15 April 1844 both these two stations were closed, as a new combined station was opened at the junction that same day, serving both railways, at the site of the present station. In 1849 a branch line to Reigate was added.

St John the Evangelist, built in 1843, was the first of Redhill's three Anglican parish churches. The parish originally stretched from Gatton in the north to Sidlow in the south.

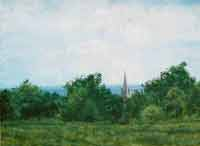
View from Redhill Common towards St John's Church August 2000

Richard Carrington, an amateur astronomer, moved to Redhill in 1852, and built a house and observatory. Dome Way, where one of Redhill's two tower block stands, is named after it. The site suited an isolated observatory, being on a spur of high ground surrounded by lower fields and marsh. Here in 1859 he made astronomical observations that first corroborated the existence of solar flares as well as their electrical influence upon the Earth and its aurorae. In 1863 he published records of sunspot observations that first demonstrated differential rotation in the Sun. In 1865 ill health prompted him to sell his house and move to Churt, Surrey. A pub is named the sun in recognition of his work.

In 1855, a large psychiatric hospital complete with well-trimmed grounds, was opened in Earlswood, south of Redhill. Prince Albert had laid the first stone in 1852. One inmate James Henry Pullen (1835–1916) was an autistic savant. He was a brilliant craftsman and artist whose work was accepted by Queen Victoria and Prince Albert. Some of Pullen's ship models, designs and artwork used to be on display at the town's Belfry Shopping Centre, but have now been moved to the Langdon Down Museum in Teddington. The asylum was renamed The Royal Earlswood Institution for Mental Defectives in June 1926, and more recently was simply named the Royal Earlswood Hospital or the royal Earlswood asylum. In 1941, the hospital became home to two of Queen Elizabeth the Queen Mother's cousins, Katherine Bowes-Lyon and Nerissa Bowes-Lyon, both of whom had learning difficulties. The hospital closed in March 1997 following the introduction of Care in the Community. The buildings were then converted to residential apartments and the site is now known as Royal Earlswood Park.

In 1868 Alfred Nobel demonstrated dynamite for the first time at a Merstham quarry, two miles north of Redhill.

In 1884, a large residential school for children, called St Anne's School, was opened by the St Anne's Society (a city of London charity) to accommodate 400 boys and girls. Built on a rise to the east of the town, and overlooking the railway station and the countryside around, it had a swimming bath, a gymnasium, tennis courts (asphalted and grassed), an external recreation ground as well as covered playgrounds, 21 pianos, a clock turret, a chapel and a dining room both capable of seating 600, a bakery, a steam laundry, an infirmary, an isolation hospital, and extensive gardens and orchards, all in property of 17½ acres. The school closed in 1919 after funding difficulties. In 1926 the Foundling Hospital used the site to house its own school, until moving elsewhere in 1935. Later, Surrey County Council used St Anne's as a Home for the Aged. In 1973 it became a home for the homeless, but closed in 1975 after being damaged by fire, and was demolished in 1987, to be replaced by housing.

The construction, to the east of Redhill, of the M23 motorway between 1972 and 1975 reduced north–south traffic through the town.

== Localities ==
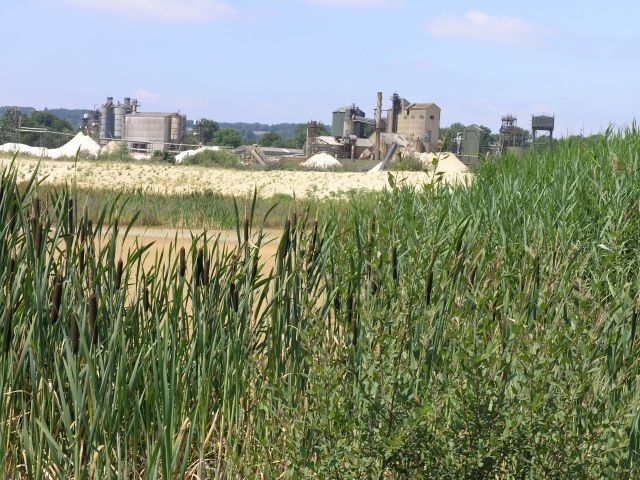
Holmethorpe Quarry, before residential development

=== Holmethorpe ===
Holmethorpe can refer to two neighbouring developments, one residential, the other commercial/industrial and separated by the west track of the Brighton Main Line directly north of Redhill. A Holmethorpe Industrial Estate member's organisation exists to provide security to and advertise recruitment among its 66 businesses and to work on traffic and local authority planning matters. Holmethorpe had at the 2001 census a population of 1,128.

=== Watercolour ===
Watercolour is a 2008–2012 built settlement and neighbourhood in Redhill towards the village of Merstham across lakes from the Greensand Ridge of the wooded village of Bletchingley and on the site of the former Holmethorpe Gravel Quarry.

=== Redstone Hill ===
Redstone Hill is above the Royal Mail sorting office and depot, centred around one of three Redhill conservation areas, across the station using the A25 or subway from most of the town. This neighbourhood includes a hotel-restaurant and unusually for a conservation area, no nationally listed buildings though some buildings are locally listed. Deep underneath the conservation area non-stopping services of the east branch of the Brighton Main Line run.

=== Redhill Common (north) and Linkfield Street ===
This area includes four nationally listed buildings: three at Grade II and one, Fengates House, at Grade II*. Fengates is a Georgian three-storey building built of red brick with grey headers and a moulded band above the second floor. Its roof is high and extends over the walls creating eaves. Its six-panel door has a moulded architrave and porch with dentil cornice.

=== Redhill Common (south) and St John's ===
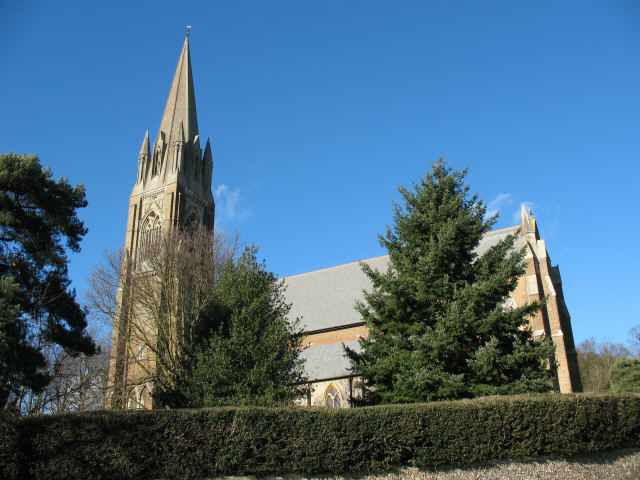
St John's

St John's is a compact urban area on a narrow promontory of Redhill Common that is upland, with moderately sized gardens between Earlswood Common and Redhill Common, reached by a hillside access road from London Road. Unusually, the addresses of many of the buildings in the hamlet do not include a road name but are merely "[number], St. John's".

The disproportionately large St John's church was built in anticipation of the development of a town in the East of Reigate Foreign close to the railway station that opened in 1841. In 1844, after the church's construction, the railway station was closed and a new one opened about a mile to the North, around which Warwick Town and then Redhill developed. It was not until 1866 that Redhill got a church of its own in the form of St Matthew's.

St John the Evangelist is one of five listed buildings (Grade II*) in the hamlet of St John's. John Loughborough Pearson remodelled it following its 1842-3 construction by James T Knowles (senior), retaining only the aisles added in 1867 by Ford & Hesketh. Pearson was awarded the RIBA Royal Gold Medal in 1880 and is remembered for a series of exceptionally fine churches. These often display strong French influence: the spire at St John's has been likened to the spires of Abbey of Saint-Étienne in Caen (St Steven's Abbey). Other Pearson characteristics at St John's are the stone-vaulted chancel and the transverse arches across the nave. Pearson's most famous building is Truro Cathedral (1880) and the first English cathedral to be built on a new site since Salisbury in the early thirteenth century. This Gothic architecture is reflected by several nearby buildings.

=== Shaw's Corner ===
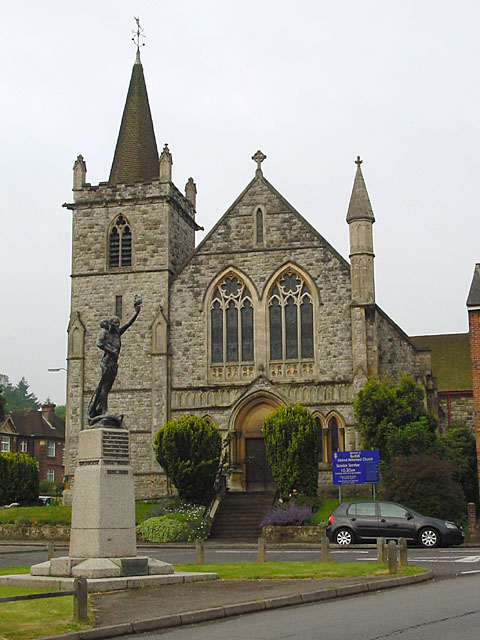
The War Memorial, with St Paul's United Reformed Church behind

Shaw's Corner centres around the junction formed on the Reigate Road, in more precise terms named Hatchlands Road before becoming here Reigate Road close and includes homes on both sides of Reigate County Court, St Paul's Church and a chapel. At this junction, on the south side in the middle of the street Blackstone Hill, is Richard R Goulden's Shaw's Corner War Memorial, a Grade II listed grand base and statue: a bronze figure on a square-set tapering stone plinth, of a man, carrying a child in one arm, and holding a flaming torch aloft with the other. At the top of the plinth is the inscription:

In memory of the men of Reigate and Redhill who fought and gave their lives in the Great War 1914–1919

On its other sides are the capitalised words Courage; Honour; and Self-Sacrifice. A further inscription beneath is graphic and includes "Flames consume the flesh. The spirit is unconquerable." World War II dates have been added since the first unveiling by Earl Beatty. Halfway along Blackstone Hill is access downhill through Redhill Common to London Road Redhill where Common expands and adjoins the south of Redhill, also known as Earlswood.

== Transport ==
=== Road ===
Redhill is at the junction of the A23 and A25 roads. It is also located within three miles of the M25 and M23 motorways, which interchange north-east of the town. Access from the M25 is via junction 6 (for Godstone) from the east and junction 8 (for Reigate) from the west, while access from the south is signed on M23 junction 9 (for Gatwick Airport).

=== Rail ===
The town is served by Redhill railway station which is located at the junction of three rail lines: the Brighton Main Line, the North Downs Line and the Redhill to Tonbridge Line. Train services are provided by Southern, Thameslink and Great Western Railway.

The station is a rail hub and is served by regular train services to London Victoria, London Bridge, Bedford, Peterborough, Gatwick Airport, Tonbridge and Reading.

Until 1845 there was a separate station from which one could travel to Ashford and Dover.

=== Buses ===
London Buses route 405, Metrobus routes 400, 410, 411, 420, 422, 424, 430, 435, 460 and Fastway 100, Compass Bus route 32 and Cruisers route 315 serve the town. All bus services in the town stop at Redhill Bus Station.

These buses provide connections to Reigate, Sutton, Epsom, Caterham, Oxted, Croydon, Dorking, Guildford, Gatwick Airport, Crawley and East Grinstead.

=== Air ===
Air access is available at London Gatwick Airport, which lies about seven miles to the south, as well as the small Redhill Aerodrome (EGKR) south-east of Redhill town centre. Heathrow airport is thirty miles to the north-west and both Luton and London City airports are accessible by train.

== Shopping ==
Redhill has a pedestrianised High Street, which is adjoined by the Belfry Shopping Centre, notable occupiers include H&M and New Look. More shops are available at the Warwick Quadrant. Notable occupiers include Choice and the Sainsbury's superstore. There is also a street market each Thursday, Friday and Saturday, sometimes including a French market. The Light, built in July 2023, has shops and a new cinema which was the first since 2011 in Redhill and an arcade. This is the first ever permanent arcade to be opened in Redhill.

== Culture and community ==
Redhill is part of the Reigate and Banstead local government district. Not far from the town is Gatton Park, an estate once owned by the Colmans; the estate has a private chapel (now open to the public) and a Japanese garden.

The town has a distinctive red-brick complex called the Warwick Quadrant, which houses the Harlequin Theatre and Cinema, and the public library, as well as Sainsbury's and other shops. The original glass canopy above the quadrant that had been installed in 1986, was replaced in 2016.

The former Odeon cinema was built in 1938. It was converted into a nightclub in 1976, operating under various names, most recently Liquid and envy, until 2011 when it was closed down permanently to make way for new housing. Despite a plan to retain the listed Art Deco façade, delays in rebuilding and a reluctance to use the façade meant it "fell into decay" and was demolished in December 2017.

The London to Brighton Veteran Car Run passes through the town each year.

== Local media ==
Local news and television programmes are provided by BBC London and ITV London. BBC South East and ITV Meridian can also be received.

The town’s local radio stations are BBC Radio Surrey on 104.0 FM, Heart South on 102.7 FM, Susy Radio on 103.4 FM and Radio Redhill that broadcast from the East Surrey Hospital on 100.4 FM.

Local newspapers are the Surrey Advertiser and Redhill and Reigate Life.

== Economy ==
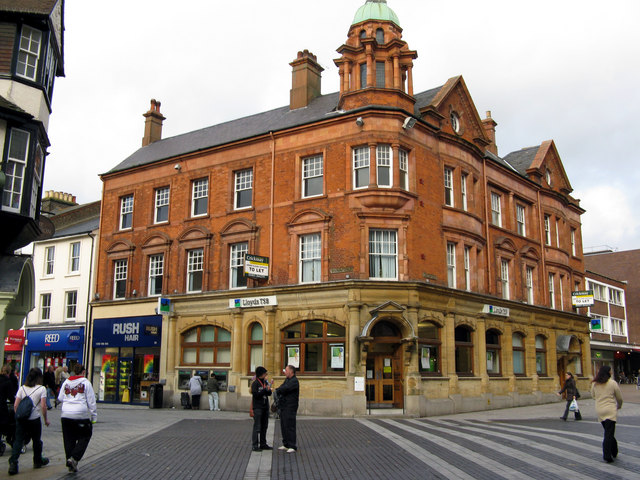
Lloyds Bank, Redhill

SES Water, Santander Consumer Finance, Axa breakdown assistance, Travelers Insurance and Aon Risk Services have their headquarters in the town. There are also three industrial and business estates: Holmethorpe Industrial Estate, Kingsfield Business Centre, and Reading Arch.

Redhill Aerodrome (IATA: KRH, ICAO: EGKR) lies 1.73 miles (2.78 km) south-east of Redhill and operates pleasure flights, flying courses, and private commercial flights.

Whilst the town is a hub in commercial terms, with a shopping centre and several offices of large companies, a large proportion of the economically active population work in Greater London and other parts of Surrey.

For some central government statistical purposes, Redhill and Reigate are classified as a subdivision of the Crawley Urban Area. Redhill is 18 miles east of Guildford. The average commuting distance in 2001 for workers was 13.8 kilometres (8.6 mi) in Redhill East and 13.6 kilometres (8.5 mi) in Redhill West. Unemployment stood at 1.81% in the east and 2.13% in the west in 2001.

The first iteration of British Island Airways had its head office at Congreve House in Redhill.

== Demography ==
Population, type of home ownership and population density were provided by the 2011 census. The proportion of households in Redhill who owned their home outright was below the regional average of 32.5%. The proportion who owned their home with a loan in each ward was within 5.5% of the regional average, in Redhill East being 5.3% greater, or 0.9% greater than the average for the borough. The data in each ward and overall for these combined showed a proportion of rented residential property and of social housing close to the average in South East England and to that of the local authority, significantly greater in Redhill West than in Redhill East where 21.8% of property was rented from a registered social landlord or directly from the local authority.

2011 Census Key Statistics
Ward	Population	Households	% Owned outright	% Owned with a loan	hectares
Redhill East	9,978	4,284	20.2	40.8	389
Redhill West	8,185	3,421	29.6	29.8	177

== Notable residents ==
- Dave Askew professional darts star who reached the semi-finals of the PDC World Championship on two occasions is from Redhill.
- Ronnie Biggs was living at Alpine Road, Redhill, when he was arrested for his part in the Great Train Robbery.
- Bernard Bresslaw, actor, best known for his part in the Carry On Films, used to live in Redhill.
- Liz May Brice, actress, best known for her role in Bad Girls was born here in 1975.
- Eric Brown, British Royal Navy officer and test pilot died here in 2016.
- Richard Christopher Carrington, a self-taught astronomer, lived in Redhill from 1852 to 1865. It was at his observatory in Redhill that he made his famous solar flare observations.
- Max Chilton, racing driver and former Formula 1 driver for Marussia F1 was born in Redhill.
- Mike Christie, singer and composer, was born and raised in Redhill.
- Aleister Crowley, occultist. He and his family lived at The Grange, Redhill between 1881 and 1884.
- Nick Falkner, cricketer
- Sir Myles Fenton, of Redstone Hall, railway manager
- Michael Greco, past EastEnders actor who played Beppe DiMarco, went to school at St Bede's in Carlton Road, Redhill.
- Carole Hersee, notable for appearing as an eight-year-old child in the central image of the television Test Card F, was born in Redhill in 1958.
- David Hewlett, actor, writer, director and voice actor best known for playing Dr. Rodney McKay in Stargate Atlantis and Stargate SG-1, was born here in 1968 before he and his family later emigrated to Canada.
- Bevis Hillier, biographer of Sir John Betjeman, was born here in 1940.
- Nick Hornby, author, was born in Redhill on 17 April 1957.
- Gareth Hunt, actor. Remembered for playing the footman Frederick Norton in Upstairs, Downstairs and Mike Gambit in The New Avengers.
- Omari Hutchinson, Chelsea F.C. footballer, was born in Redhill.
- Kevin Kenner, American-born concert pianist, lives in Redhill.
- Jessie Mei Li, actress was raised in Redhill.
- John Linnell, painter, rival to John Constable, lived in Redhill.
- Diana Liverman, well known geographer, lived and went to school in Redhill
- Ian McKay (formerly Laidlaw), art critic and writer, lived here between 1976 and 1980.
- Robert Milsom, Aberdeen F.C. midfielder, was born here.
- Samuel Palmer, landscape painter, etcher, and printmaker, lived in Redhill from 1862 until his death in 1881.
- Derek Paravicini, the celebrated blind savant prodigy, lives at the RNIB College in Redhill
- Henry Thomas Pringuer, organist and composer, was organist at St Matthew's, Redhill c. 1870–1880.
- Sophie Raworth, journalist and newsreader, was born here in 1968.
- Alec Harley Reeves, electronics engineer, inventor of pulse-code modulation, was born here in 1902.
- Chris Robshaw, current San Diego Legion and Former England Rugby captain, was born in Redhill in 1986.
- Emily Ronalds, social reformer, lived at Earlswood Common from 1853 for over twenty years
- Anna Smith, tennis player, was born in Redhill in 1988.
- George Smith, England footballer and league manager, coached Redhill F.C. 1951–52.
- Matt Weston, Double Olympic skeleton champion, born in Redhill, 1997.
- David Wiffen, singer-songwriter, born in Redhill, 1942.
- Emily Orman, professional footballer, 2002.

== Government ==
Surrey County Council has two representatives from Redhill, elected every four years. As of the 2021 Surrey County Council election, the representatives are:

- Jonathan Essex, representing the division of Redhill East, of the Green Party
- Natalie Bramhall, representing the division of Redhill West & Meadvale, of the Conservative Party

6 councillors sit on Reigate and Banstead borough council, who are:

Term	Member	Ward
2014 – 2023	Jonathan Essex	Redhill East
2016 – 2022	Stephen McKenna	Redhill East
2019 – 2024	Sue Sinden	Redhill East
2016 – 2023	Natalie Bramhall	Redhill West and Wray Common
2018 – 2022	Rich Michalowski	Redhill West and Wray Common
2019 – 2024	Kanika Sachdeva	Redhill West and Wray Common

== Sport and recreation ==
The town features:

- Redhill Bowling Club, a lawn Bowling club based in Redhill
- Redhill FC, a non-league football club who play at Kiln Brow
- Donyngs leisure Centre, which includes an indoor swimming pool and a gym
- Sailing, canoeing and windsurfing are available at Mercers Country Park
- The Gym Group, Quadrant Shopping Centre, Redhill

== Education ==
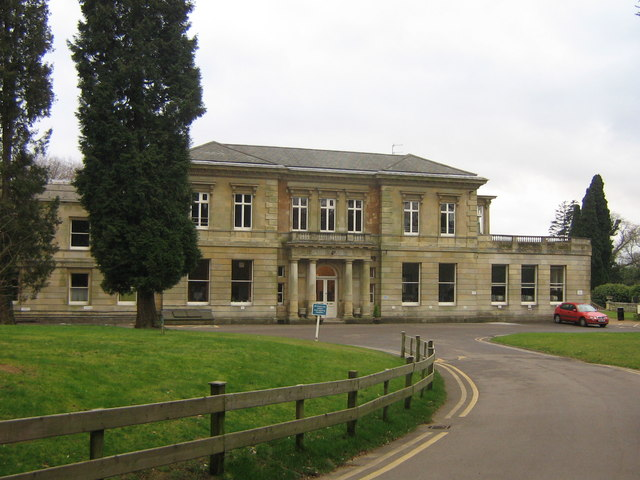
Dunottar School, near Redhill Common

- St. Bede's School, a secondary school specialising in Music and IT.
- East Surrey College is based in Redhill.
- Carrington School, a state secondary school is in Noke Drive.
- Dunottar School, close by Redhill Common. Founded in 1926, this independent girls' school moved here in 1933, into "High Trees", built by Walter Blanford Waterlow in 1867.
- St. John's primary school is to the south of the town.

== See also ==
- List of places of worship in Reigate and Banstead
