= Lower Kingswood =

Village in Surrey, England

Coordinates: 51.29396°N 0.21149°W

- Location within Surrey
- Population: 3,050
- OS grid reference: TQ248565
- District: Reigate and Banstead
- Shire county: Surrey
- Region: South East
- Country: England
- Sovereign state: United Kingdom
- Post town: Tadworth
- Postcode district: KT20
- Dialling code: 01737
- Police: Surrey
- Fire: Surrey
- Ambulance: South East Coast
- UK Parliament: Reigate

Lower Kingswood is a village located in Surrey, just within the M25 motorway. It is between Kingswood and Reigate, and is bisected by the A217 dual carriageway. Neighbouring settlements include Tadworth and Reigate also Redhill.

== History ==
The village was situated around the Brighton Road (now the A217) and the crossroads with Buckland Road/Smithy Lane, the centre being where the Fox On The Hill pub, now an Indian restaurant and takeaway, and the Church of the Wisdom of God are located. Before the upgrading of the A217 Brighton Road to a dual carriageway, there was a pond outside the pub, where horses would frequently stop to drink after climbing the hill and before progressing on to Reigate. The name “Lower Kingswood” dates back to the reign of King Henry VIII. Kingswood and lower Kingswood were the royal hunting woods. The Sportsman public house in Mogador was originally Henry’s hunting lodge. Henry had a palace on Nonsuch park “Nonsuch Palace” and the surrounding royal land stretched from Merton Abbey to Reigate.

== Transport ==
The nearest railway stations are Reigate, Kingswood Railway Station and Redhill Railway Station. Buses travel along the A217, north to Epsom and Sutton and south to Reigate and Redhill. Lower Kingswood is situated very close to Junction 8 of the M25. Bus Transport is not the best, buses end at 7:45 coming south from Redhill and Reigate.

== Socialising ==
There are several social clubs in Lower Kingswood, catering for all ages, including youth clubs such as drama and football. For the older generations there is a bowls club and Women's Institute. The football club is named Kingswood Terriers FC and they play in the local Epsom and Ewell Youth League.

There is a recreation ground opposite Rookery Way, which includes a play park, bike ramps and football pitches.

The Kingswood Village Club (Lower Kingswood) has been voted CAMRA (Campaign for Real Ale) branch club of the year for four years running, from 2011 to 2014.

== See also ==
- List of places of worship in Reigate and Banstead
