= St John's, Redhill =

Village and parish in Surrey, England

Coordinates: 51°13′44″N 0°10′39″W

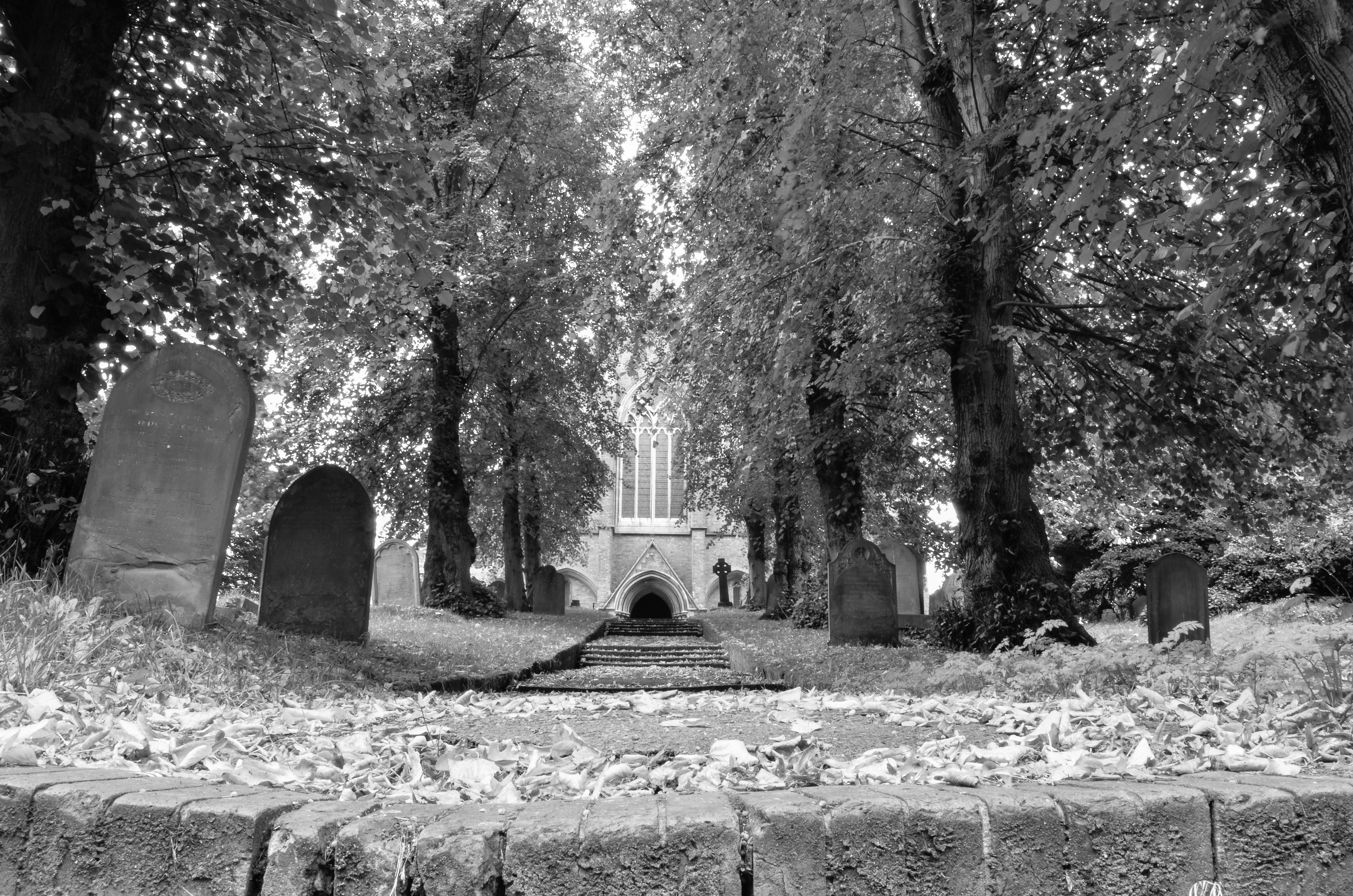
St John's churchyard

St John's is a hamlet on the fringes of Redhill, Surrey, England. The small elevated residential community occupies a conservation area encircled by Earlswood and the wooded Redhill Common, which is connected along two low to mid rise streets with typically woodland-style gardens to Reigate. St John's is in its wider definition one of the three ecclesiastical parishes that make up Redhill. The area around St John's school and church had small beginnings but at one time grew so rapidly it was thought that it was the nucleus of a new town.

== St John's School ==
The history of St John's School began on 21 August 1840 when a decision was taken at a parish vestry meeting to claim compensation from the London, Brighton and South Coast Railway Company for the loss of grazing and other rights when it built the railway across common land in the manor. Four years later, the churchwardens held a meeting to decide what to do with the £535.7s thus obtained. Their decision was to spend one third of it on the poor rate and two thirds on building a National School at St John's. The Schools (Boys', Girls' and Infants') opened in 1845 and St John's, now in the form of a Community Primary school, is still going strong.

== Church of St John the Evangelist ==
The church is Anglican and in the mid-higher category over the standard grade, Grade II*. The first version of the building here was built, on a prominent site on a spur of the North Downs, to designs by James Thomas Knowles (1806–1884), father of Sir James Knowles, in 1843. Aisles were added to designs by Ford & Hesketh 1867. The great change came in 1889, when John Loughborough Pearson was called on to remodel the church. He replaced the original building with a new nave and chancel, retaining the 1867 aisles, and in 1895 he added a new south-west steeple. The Pearson work is faced externally with stock brick with stone dressings, contrasting with the flint facings of the aisles.

Pearson's building is typical of his major churches, and shares characteristic features with such buildings as St Stephen, Bournemouth, All Saints, Hove, St Augustine, Kilburn and St John, South Norwood. The nave has five bays with arcades and clerestory. The west entrance is under a stone vaulted gallery and the timber roof is supported on stone transverse arches carried on shafts attached to the older arcade pillars. The three-bay chancel is narrower, the space being occupied by passage aisles for the western two bays, separating the chancel from a chapel on the south and organ chamber on the north. The south-west steeple rises to 185 ft. The tower has shallow set-back buttresses and a short octagonal spire with corner spirelets and single lucarnes. The eight bells are by Mears & Stainbank, 1895, rehung in 1972.

The interior is entirely faced with stone. The windows contain an almost complete series of stained glass installed by Clayton & Bell under Pearson's direction. The handsome triptych reredos, designed by Pearson, 1898, with small panel paintings in an elaborate gilded frame, has been conserved and re-gilded. There is a fine iron chancel screen of 1910, and the organ is by Willis, 1897, rebuilt by Hill, Norman & Beard in 1968. The marble pulpit, featuring the raising of Lazarus, and the font, in the form of a kneeling angel, date from 1882. The churchyard wall, of knapped flints, was built in 1867.

It is understood that the vestry was erected by F L Pearson after his father's death, but probably following his plans. It stands alongside the organ chamber, which forms an eastward extension of the north aisle, with a three-light window with Geometrical traces, in the east gable.

The vestry consists of a western section forming the choir vestry, gabled at right-angles to the aisle. with a three-light window in the north gable, and entered by a doorway in the west wall, and a clergy vestry to the east with a flat roof concealed by a straight moulded parapet with an east window of four small equal arched lights.
