= Reigate Hundred =

Historical division of Surrey, England

Coordinates: 51.204°N 0.192°W

Reigate was a hundred in the historic county of Surrey, England. It was geographically consonant with the southern two thirds of the current Borough of Reigate and Banstead together with two parishes in Tandridge and fractions of former parishes in the London Borough of Croydon and Borough of Crawley, West Sussex. Accordingly, it included the medieval-established town of Reigate with its motte castle and land which became the towns of Redhill and Horley.

== Scope ==
The Reigate hundred included the parishes of: Betchworth, Burstow, Buckland, Charlwood, Chipstead, Gatton, Horley, Leigh, Merstham, Nutfield and Reigate.

In the Domesday Book of 1086, the hundred was known as Cherchefelle, comprised 222 households and included Reigate, the Nutfields, Buckland, the Mersthams, Chipstead, Gatton and Worth; in 1199 it became known as Reigate.

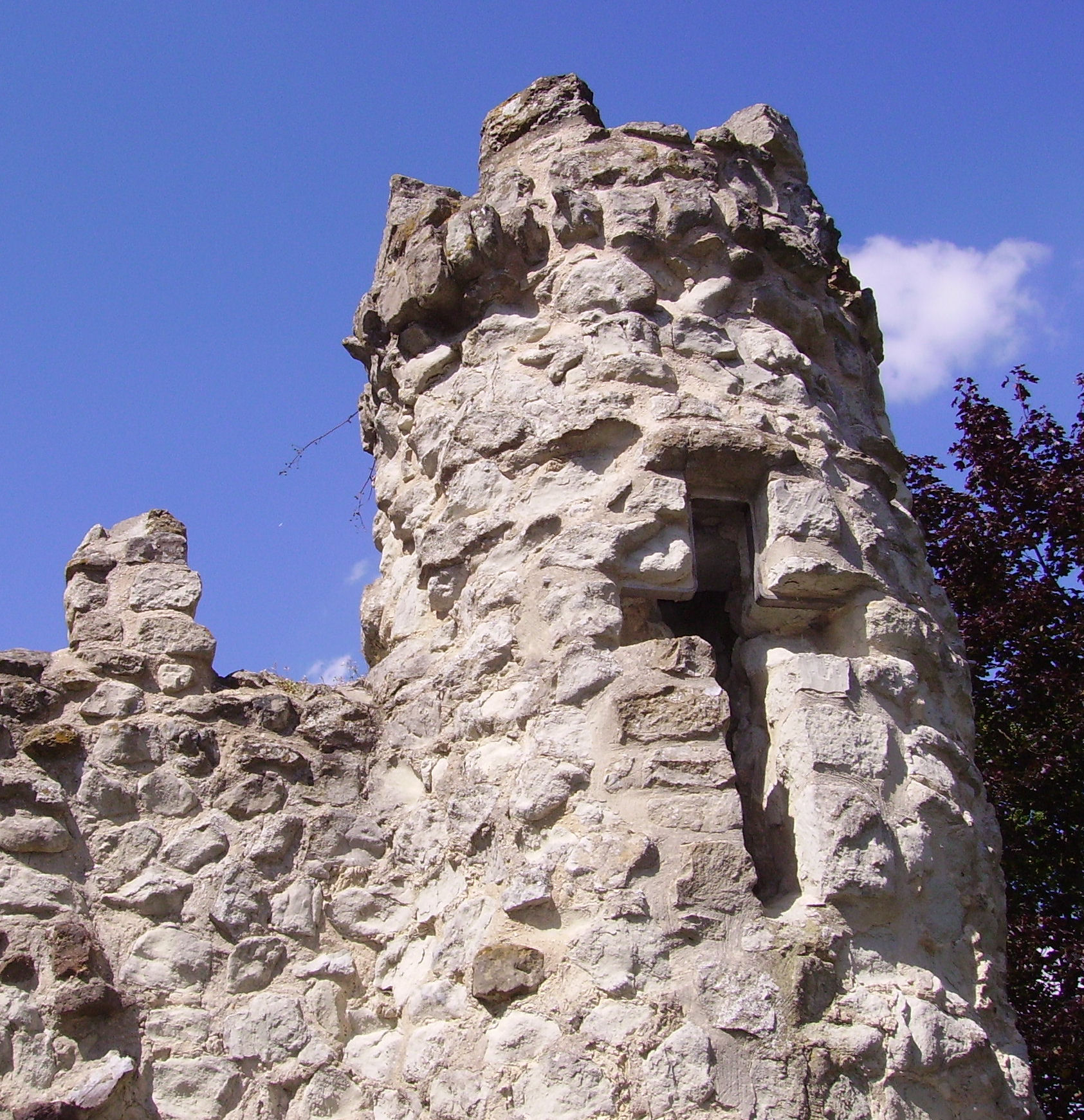
Reigate Castle lay within the Reigate hundred

== Demise ==
The Hundred never had significant administrative roles, which were instead carried out by various urban and rural sanitary districts alongside earlier poor law unions, which were organised to reflect the Industrial Revolution in a less manorial and parochial, patchy way in the 19th century. By the end of that century, civil parishes had subsumed the remaining civil functions of the vestry of each parish in the region, and many new functions such as road laying were passed to Surrey County Council which, with central government bodies, took on their remaining purpose, that of national and local poor relief taxation.

== Modern settlements and administration ==
The division of land amounts to the southern two-thirds of the modern borough of Reigate and Banstead subjected to reduced boundaries losing approximately 4.7 square kilometres (plus the loss of outlying easterly Burstow and Nutfield to Tandridge and loss of Gatwick Airport to West Sussex much of which was in Horley and Charlwood) — in 1933 a relatively large 269 acres (1.09 km^{2}) of Chipstead and 884 acres (3.58 km^{2}) of Merstham in the north were lost to elevated Coulsdon within Greater London. As with Chipstead, Coulsdon is in an upper valley and plateau of the North Downs however has more railway stations and is a post town. It is the least dense former parish in the London Borough of Croydon.

Horley has become the town of the south of the borough and one of the four towns shown the borough logo — Reigate and Redhill are in the historic hundred, leaving Banstead to the north which was not.

The post and railway town of Redhill (RH postcode area) which did not exist in the early 19th century resulting from the Brighton railway being opened in 1841 and the Reading-Ashford line in 1844. It has become during the 20th century and beyond a major town on land formerly in Reigate and Merstham, expanding into the latter into the 21st century with little buffer between the three settlements today; the three forming a conurbation keeping boundaries close to the far side of the Greensand Ridge and North Downs, to the south and north respectively. Even in the 19th century rural and a rotten borough, Gatton apart from Upper Gatton within the M25 has become part of Reigate and of Redhill, indivisible from those towns while retaining Gatton Park occupied by a co-educational independent school, The Royal Alexandra and Albert School. A fraction of its land has been opened up to the public by the National Trust but is now approximately half residential land in Reigate and Redhill.

Burstow's main settlement and 'village' today has become what was once its medium-sized hamlet or neighbourhood of 'Smallfield' and it has spawned an entirely independent village since the early 20th century, Outwood, Surrey.

Salfords and Earlswood are a village and suburb to Redhill-Reigate, which occupy former fields and woodland of Horley and Reigate. Brockham, from the 1900s a hamlet of village size, was formally created a civil parish from the western 1,181 acres (4.78 km^{2}) of Betchworth in 1933.

== See also ==
- Medieval Surrey
- Surrey hundreds
- Charlwood and Horley Act 1974 consequent upon Gatwick Airport re-affirming the expansion of West Sussex implemented that year.
