= St Andrew's Church, Gatton =

St Andrew's Gatton
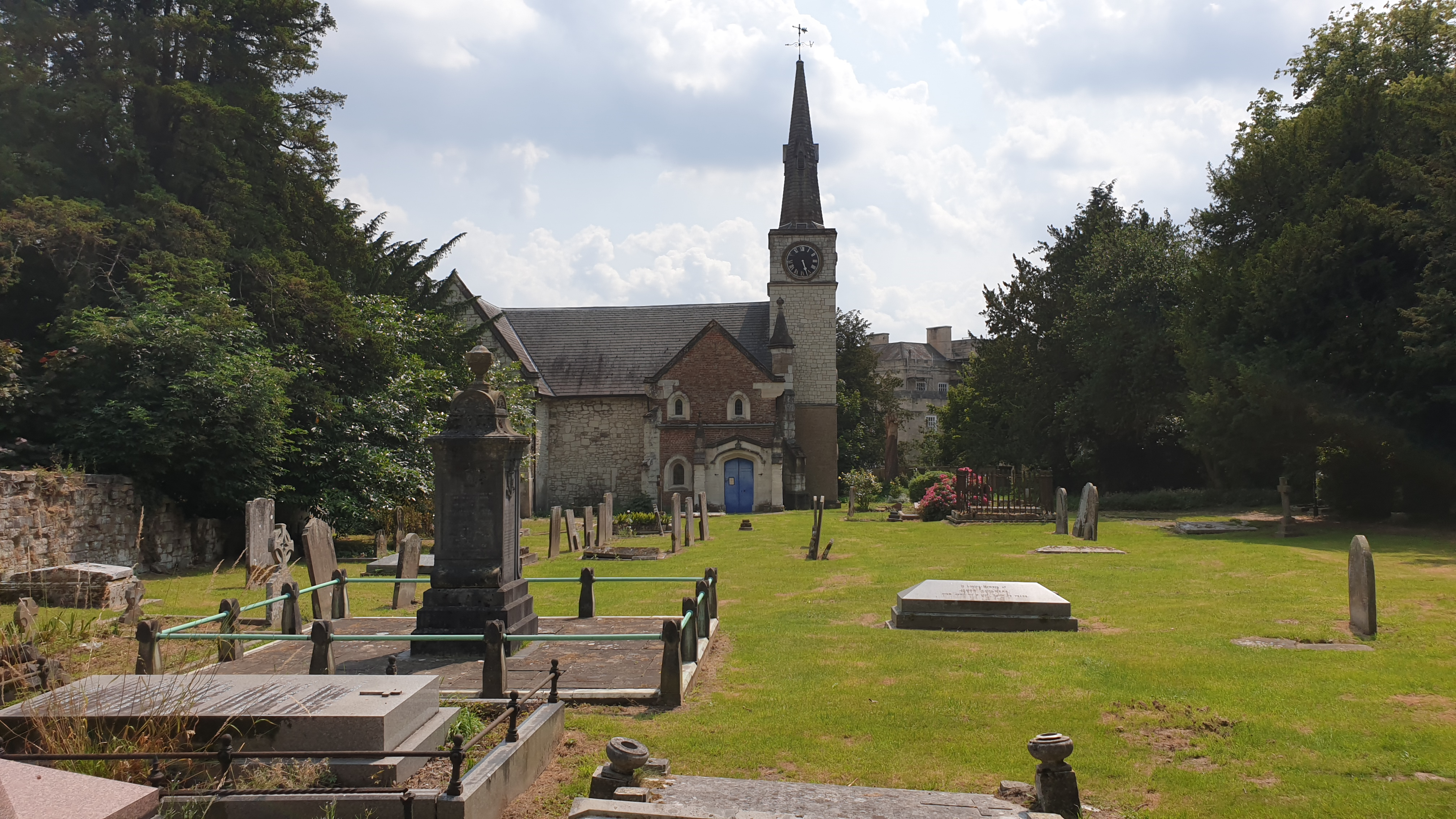

- Location of St Andrew's, Gatton
- 51.26073324°N 0.1736285088°W
- Location: Gatton Park, Gatton, Surrey, RH2 0TG
- Country: England
- Denomination: Church of England
- Website: Church website

History
- Status: Active
- Founded: pre-880AD
- Dedication: St Andrew

Architecture
- Functional status: Parish church
- Heritage designation: Grade I listed
- Architect(s): Unknown, E Webb
- Years built: C13, 1834

Administration
- Diocese: Diocese of Southwark
- Archdeaconry: Archdeaconry of Reigate
- Deanery: Reigate
- Parish: Merstham & Gatton Team Ministry

Clergy
- Vicar: Revd Nigel Griffiths

The Church of St Andrew, Gatton is a Church of England church in Gatton, near Reigate in Surrey, England. It is a Grade I listed. The earliest record of a church on the site is in 880AD. Some fabric from the 13th century survives including a piscina and the font, but the church we see today mostly dates from an idiosyncratic restoration by Frederick, Baron Monson, and his architect E. Webb in 1834.

== Location ==
The church sits in Gatton Park (landscaped by Capability Brown), and next to Gatton Hall, the former home of the Barons Monson. St Andrew's served as much as the family's private chapel as the parish church. The last private owners of Gatton Hall moved out after 1945 and the Hall has since been acquired by The Royal Alexandra and Albert School.

== Interior ==
The interior is laid out like a collegiate chapel rather than a parish church, with pews facing each other across the central aisle. There area an unusual number of high-quality antique fittings collected by Frederick, 5th Baron Monson from around Europe and installed in the church which was next to his residence at Gatton Hall. These include a pulpit and altar from Nuremberg, carved doors from Rouen, presbytery stalls from a disestablished monastery in Ghent, altar rails from Tongeren and stained glass from Aarschot. Some of the carvings on the altar and pulpit appear to come from a lost altarpiece from the workshop of Jan Genoots, perhaps dating from circa 1525–30.

The Pevsner Architectural Guides describe this as "perhaps the best example in the country of the tendency for the church to become an extension of the landlord's parlour or sculpture gallery".

== Family pew ==
The Monson family pew is particularly unusual. It occupies the north transept and has its own private entrance connected to the hall by a covered walkway. It contains a fireplace and is furnished with upholstered chairs and benches. The Pevsner Architectural Guides describe it as "the perfect example of the English nobleman's wish to worship in comfort... With its atmosphere of being a sumptuous private chapel that has somehow got detached from the house, it is among the best in the country."

== Gallery ==
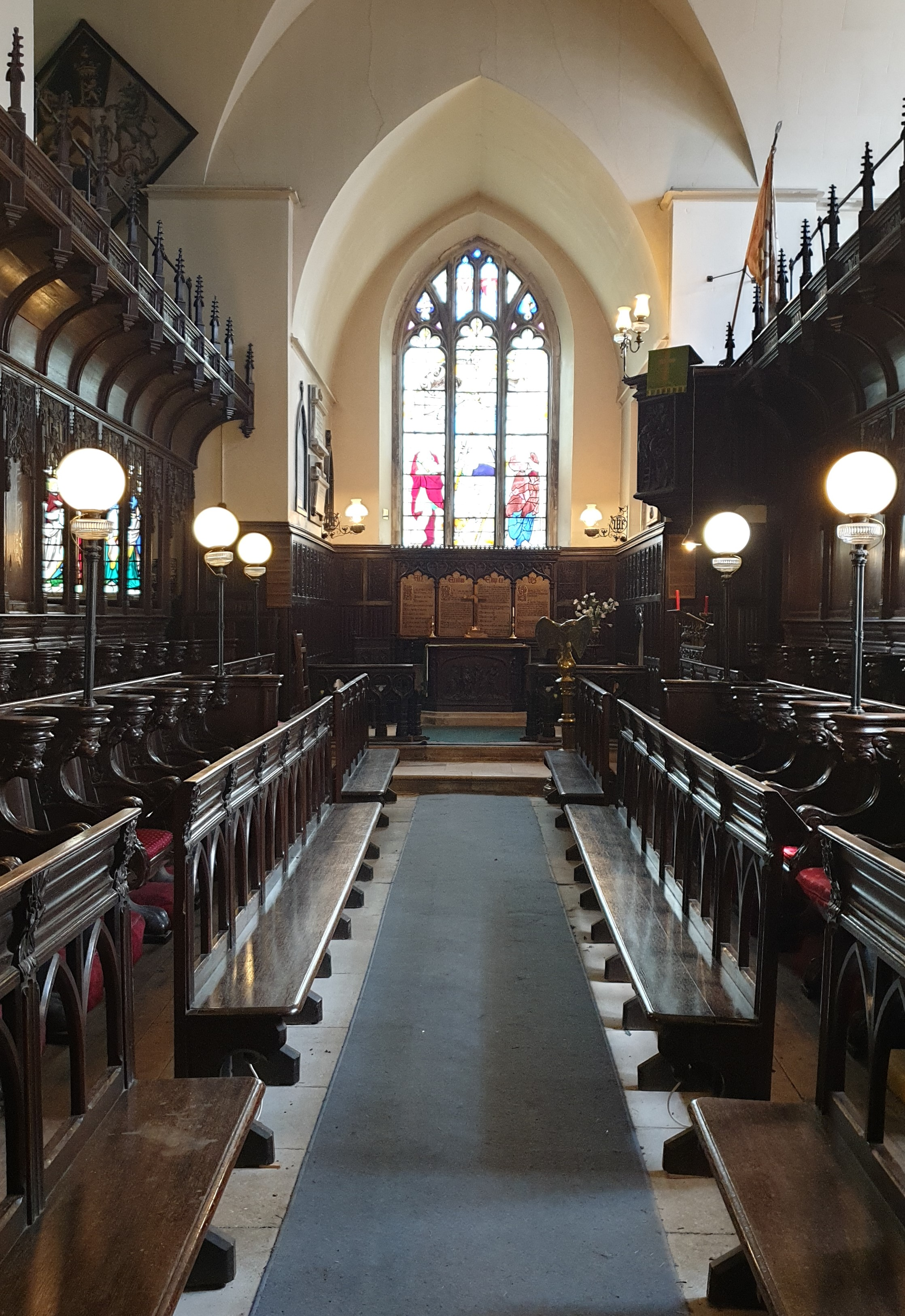
Interior

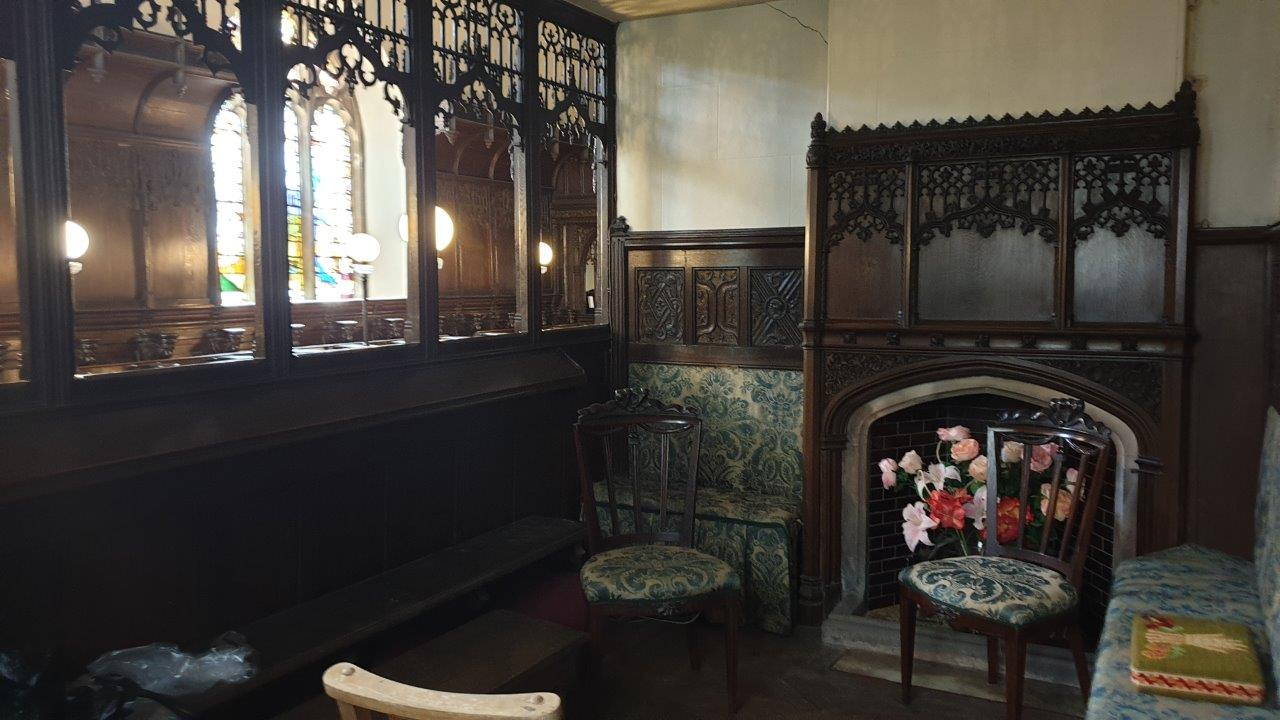
Monson family pew

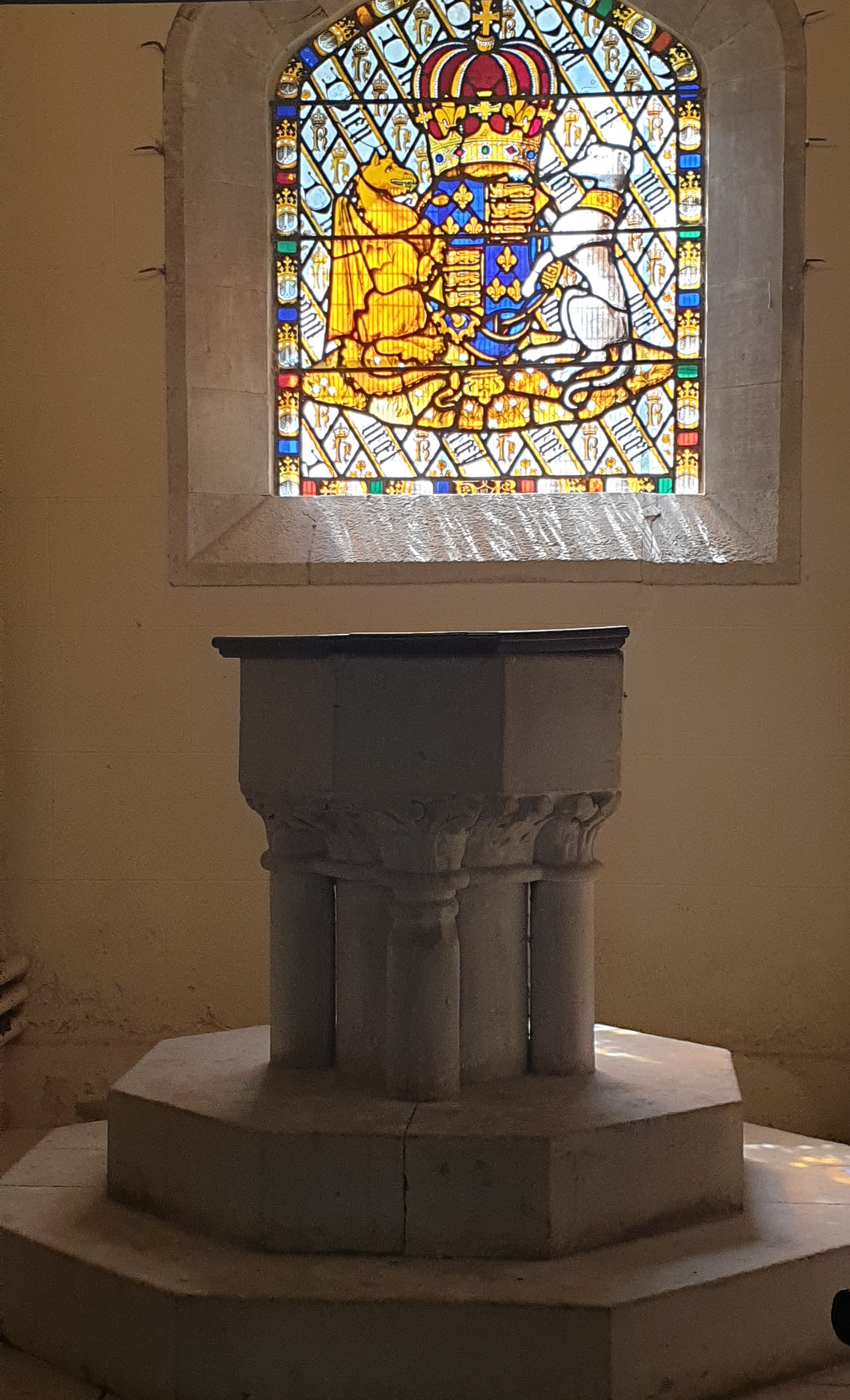
Baptistry: C13 font; stained glass probably c.1830

== Sources ==
- Nairn, Ian; Pevsner, Nikolaus; Cherry, Bridget (1971). Surrey. The Buildings of England (2nd ed.). London: Penguin Books. pp. 250–251. ISBN 0140710213.
