= Gatton, Surrey =

Coordinates: 51°15′N 0°10′W

Gatton
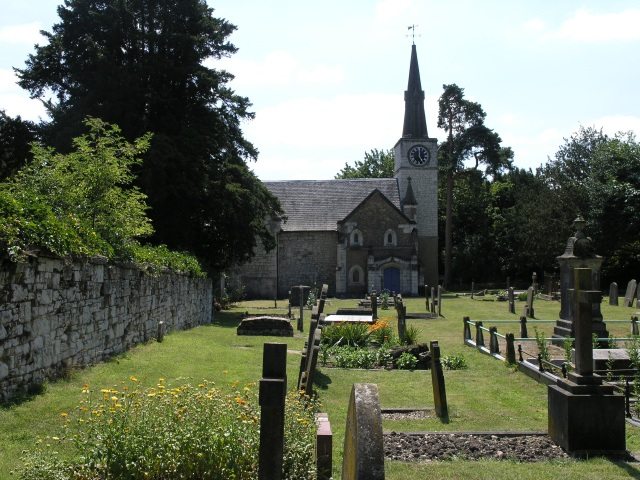
- St Andrew's Church, Gatton

- Location within Surrey
- District: Reigate and Banstead
- Shire county: Surrey
- Region: South East
- Country: England
- Sovereign state: United Kingdom

Gatton is a former village in the Borough of Reigate and Banstead, Surrey, England. It survives as a sparsely populated, predominantly rural locality, which includes Gatton Park, no more than 12 houses, and two farms on the slopes of the North Downs near Reigate.

The parish lay within Reigate hundred. It is a former rotten borough and a former civil parish. In 1951 the parish had a population of 628.

== Toponymy ==
Early forms of Gatton's name include Gatatune (recorded between 871 and 889) and Gatetuna (in 1121). The name is thought to mean "goat-farm". This may indicate either that the township had a specialised function (goat-farming) within the economy of a much larger Anglo-Saxon estate; or that it was required to make a specialised tribute obligation, in the form of goats, to its overlord.

== History ==
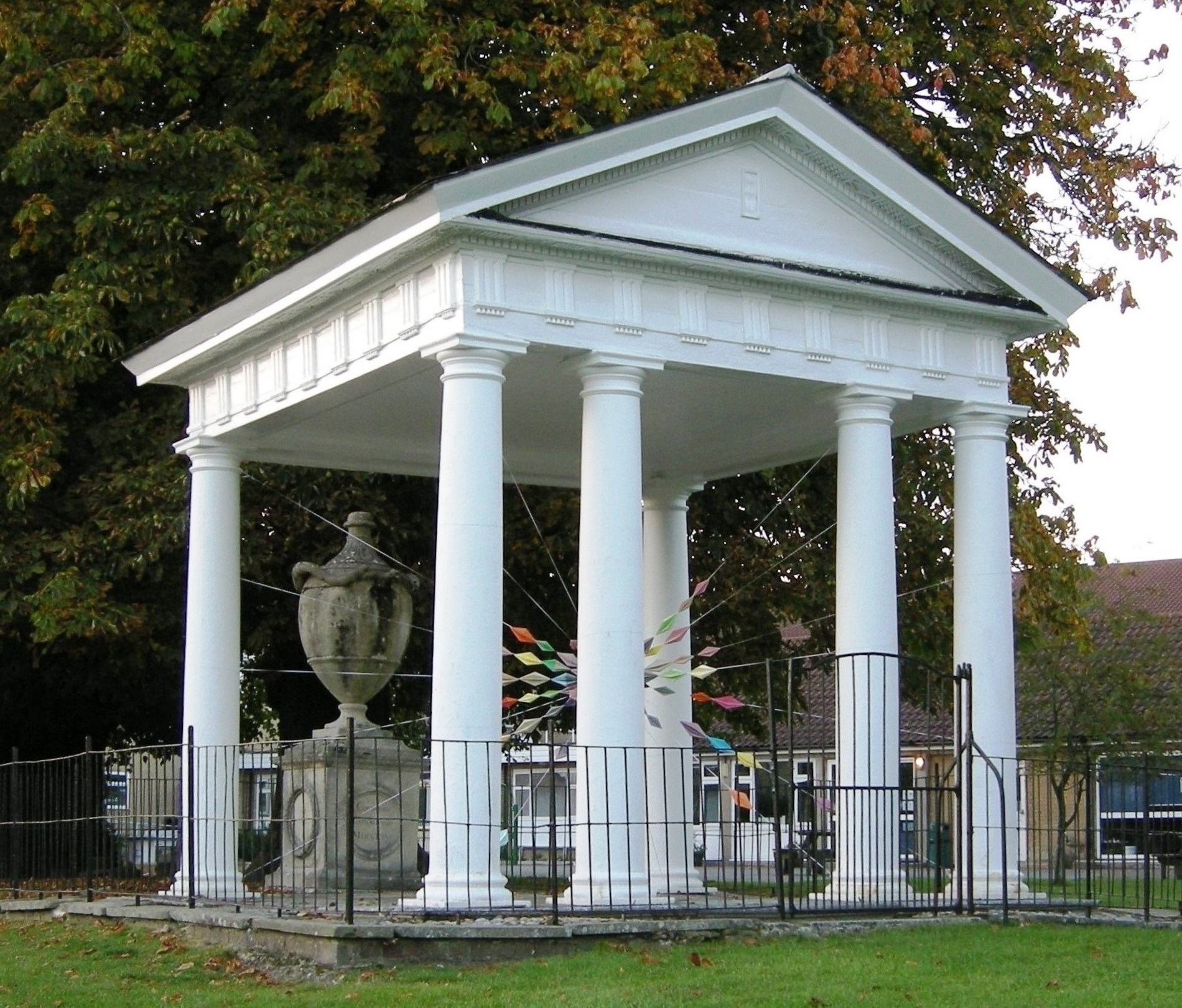
Gatton "Town Hall"

Gatton appears in the Domesday Book of 1086 as Gatone. It was held by Herfrid from the Bishop of Bayeux. Its Domesday assets were: 2½ hides; 5 ploughlands; a church; 6 acres (24,000 m^{2}) of meadow; and woodland and grazing for 7 pigs. It rendered £6.

From 1332 onwards Gatton was taxed as a town (at a higher rate than that payable by a village or rural settlement); and from 1450 part of the parish was the parliamentary borough of Gatton, sending two members to the House of Commons. However, there is no evidence of the late medieval settlement developing any other distinctively urban characteristics. Instead, the settlement shrank, and by the beginning of the 17th century the antiquary William Camden was able to describe it as "scarce a small village, though in times past it hath beene a famous towne". By 1831 the parliamentary borough had only seven voters and 23 houses, placing it among the most notorious of "rotten boroughs". It was abolished by the Reform Act 1832.

Gatton "Town Hall", on Gatton Park estate, is a folly erected in 1765: it takes the form of an open Doric temple. It was here that the parliamentary elections were held. Behind it stands a large urn bearing a Latin inscription, which includes the line "Salus populi Suprema Lex Esto": "Let the well-being of the people be the supreme law". James Ogilvy commented in 1914: "The whole erection could shelter about thirty people from the rain; whether it superseded an earlier town hall does not appear to be known."

A salient of the parish ran southwards, south of Merstham to the boundary of Nutfield, but it was added to Merstham in 1899.

On 1 April 1974 the parish was abolished.

== Church ==
The church is dedicated to St Andrew. Before the early 19th century, it was a late medieval building revealing evidence of early Norman origins. It was heavily remodelled in the "Gothick" style in 1834 by Frederick John Monson, 5th Baron Monson, essentially as his private chapel and a showcase for his collections. Its contents include a fine 15th-century rood screen, brought from another unidentified English church. In 1930, stones from the structure were removed by Sir Jeremiah Colman (1st Bart.) and the rector of Gatton and given to Colorado College of Colorado Springs, USA, to be incorporated into the Eugene Percy Shove Memorial Chapel in honour of the donor's ancestor, Edward Shove, rector of Gatton 1615–1646.

The church is adjacent to the Royal Alexandra and Albert School. It is now used generally as a chapel: it has a joint benefice with and is reliant for regular services on services in Merstham Village, the conservation area part of Merstham.

== Geography ==
Gatton lies on the crest of the escarpment of the North Downs and on its southern slopes, primarily in the Reigate (RH2) post town. Gatton Park, forming most of its southern half, is now the location of the Royal Alexandra and Albert School: Gatton Hall, the historic stately home at its centre, is used as a boarding house. As defined by its ecclesiastical parish, Gatton has no more than 12 houses. In Gatton to the north, Upper Gatton Farm, Crossways Farm, Old Trees and Olde Forge (all along High Road) are all on the crest (uplands) of the North Downs near to Chipstead, a large village adjoining Gatton to the north.

=== The North Downs Way ===
The North Downs Way passes from Colley Hill on the Reigate/Kingswood border into the area of Gatton at the top of Reigate Hill, through Gatton Park and then Reigate Hill golf course, there descending into Quality Street, Old Merstham and into the M25 ring, along Rockshaw Road and up to Chaldon.

=== Gatton Park ===
Gatton Park has extensive landscaped grounds, and these wider areas, away from the public footpath, are opened to the public on a few afternoons each year.

=== Gatton Bottom ===
Gatton Bottom is a road following a dry valley/dene from Reigate Hill to the near the top of Old Merstham and is known as one of three access roads from the south side to the Junction 8 interchange of the M25, the others being Wray Lane (one-way) and Reigate Hill. This area still marks the border between the steep downs' rise to its north and the rise then fall of Gatton Park to its south. Homes surrounding the east of Gatton Bottom are all in the Merstham Village Conservation Area.

=== Elevations, soil and geology ===
Gatton's elevations range from 215m AOD, the highest elevation, along Fort Lane, a cul-de-sac off the intersection of Reigate Hill (M25 Junction 8) which leads to four homes over the boundary in Reigate, a radio transmitter station, and a water tower. On the A217 is the Bridge House Hotel, whose name refers to a footbridge carrying the North Downs Way across the A217 85m to the east.

Three main types of soil form bands from north to south. However, in the fields to the northeast, i.e. mostly made up of Upper Gatton Park and Farm, there is a round area of "free-draining, slightly acid, sandy soil" which as the Soilscape study indicates is used for dry pasture, coniferous woodland and, as not stated there, for wheat. One wood includes a small section in the east the "freely draining slightly acid loamy soil" that provides the infill of the Downs and is seen for example in Kingswood and counterintuitively all of the southern developed parts of Reigate, Redhill, most of Dorking, much and all of central Croydon and all around the lowland commons, heaths and parks of south-west London. Throughout the north, the soil is fertile "slightly acid loamy and clayey soil with impeded drainage", interrupted by a steep narrow middle course of mid-fertility "shallow lime-rich soils over chalk or limestone" which the M25 motorway passes through in Gatton, producing a sheer chalk face on the northern bank east of the Junction 8 interchange, whereas on its very gradual descent to the north-west close to Leatherhead grassed banks surround a far more shallow chalk cutting of the M25 – the only other locations where the M25 passes through chalk slopes are approaching Junction 4 close to Orpington, Halstead and Shoreham, Kent. Across the south of Gatton Park and Reigate Hill Golf Course soil is "slowly permeable, seasonally wet slightly acid but base-rich, loamy and clayey".

In terms of geology, overlying the rather older Hythe, Sandgate and Folkestone Beds under even deeper seas, Gault Clay and the Upper Greensand were deposited. The Gault Clay contains phosphate-rich nodules in discrete bands and has a rich marine fauna with abundant ammonites, bivalves and gastropods. The Upper Greensand comprises a variety of sediments with fine silts at the base giving way upwards into type of sandstone.

Beginning 90 million years ago the North Downs hard chalk was deposited, a white limestone comprising over 95% calcium carbonate. This contains thin beds of marl and nodules of flint, either scattered or in bands. The North Downs extending from Farnham to Dover, Kent are formed by this chalk. They now have an often white, almost vertical south-facing slope.
