= Edward Pickard =

English dissenting minister

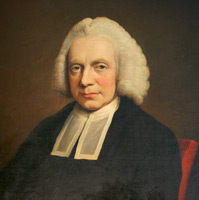
Edward Pickard

Edward Pickard (3 December 1714 - 10 February 1778) was an English dissenting minister who founded the Orphan Working School in 1758. The Orphan school would eventually become a school in Reigate in Surrey. He also led a group who tried to change the law restricting the rights of dissenting ministers.

== Biography ==
Pickard was born in Alcester in Warwickshire in 1714. He attended a number of dissenting schools before taking up with a congregation. However his views changed through Calvinism to Arianism and he moved on through a number of churches before coming to London as an afternoon preacher.

In 1758 he was working as an assistant to Thomas Newman at the Presbyterian meeting in Carter Lane. Whilst there he was the leading light of fourteen people who met and founded the Orphan Working School. In the following year, Newman died and he took over the congregation.

Between 1772 and 1774, Pickard gathered together the dissenting ministers in order that the terms of the 1689 Toleration Act for dissenting clergy could be modified. Under his leadership parliament twice considered a bill to modify the law. Both were unsuccessful and it was not until Pickard and many had lost interest that a new attempt was made in 1779.

Pickard died of a fever in 1778, outliving Frances Sanderson, his wife. His orphan school went on under the guidance of Joseph Soul to arrive in the twentieth century where it was transformed into an orphanage for the poor into The Royal Alexandra and Albert School, a boarding school in Surrey.
