= Matbro =

Brand of tractor forklift

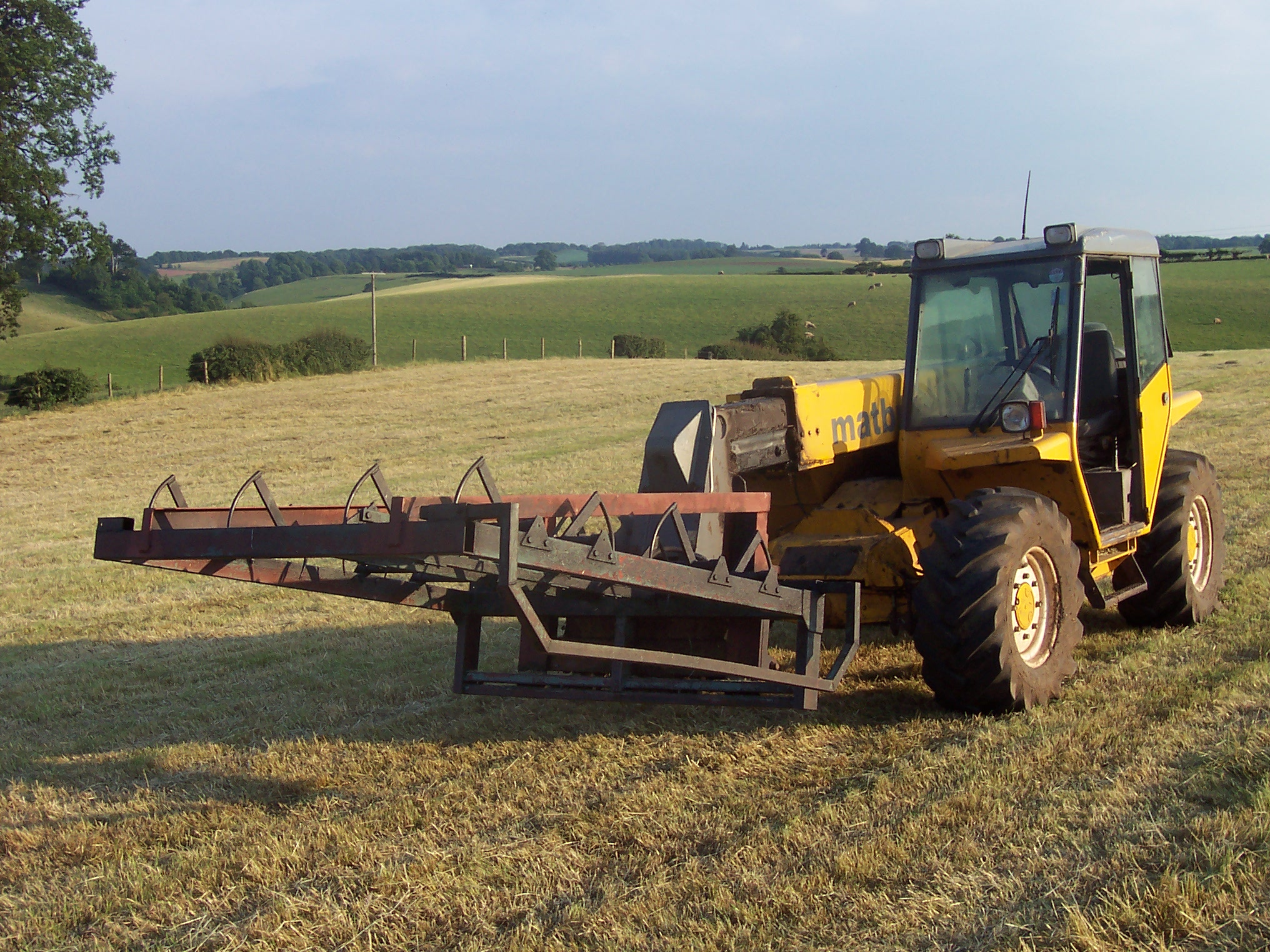
Matbro TS270 with a flat 8 bale grab for small square bales

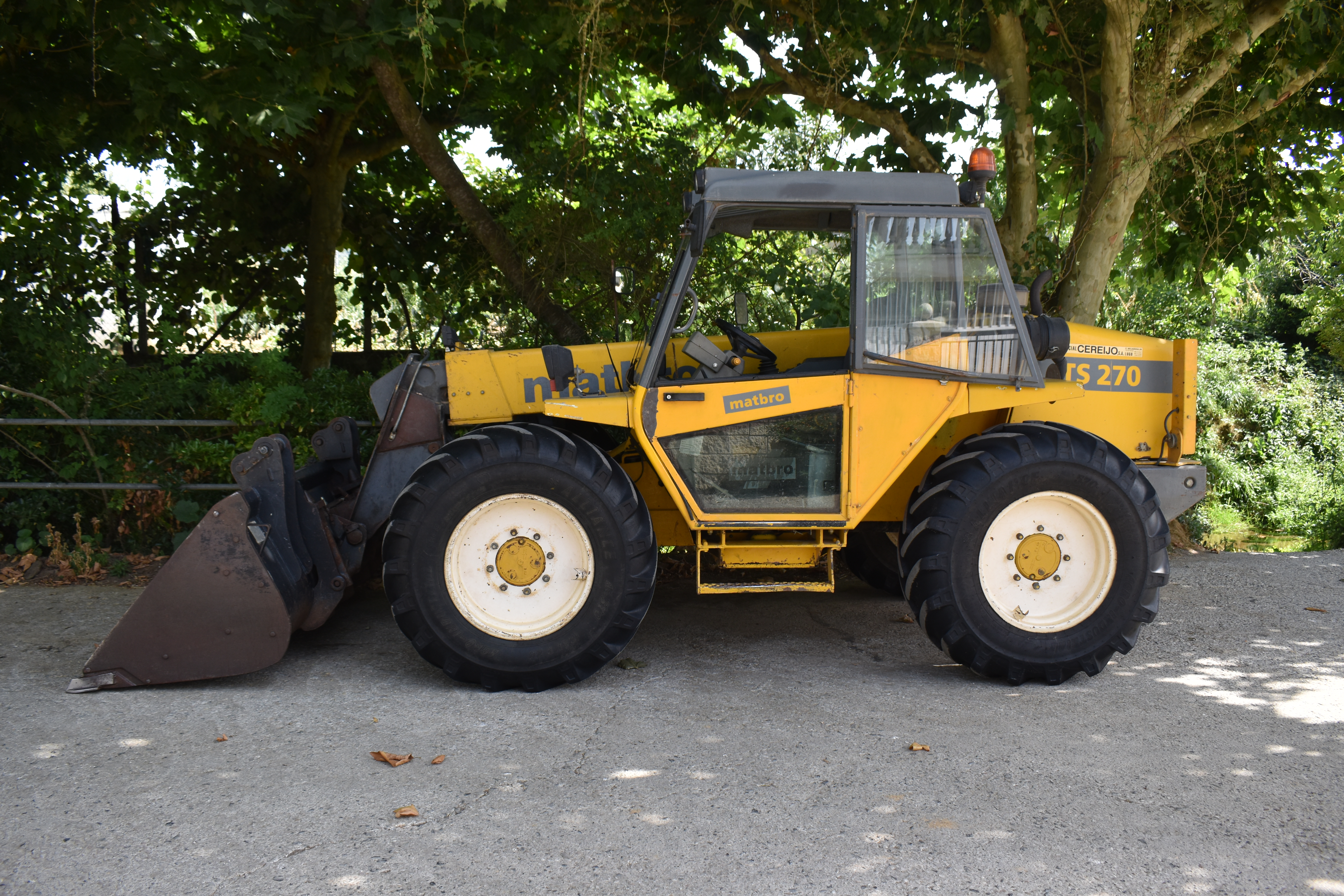
Matbro TS270 in Galicia, Spain.

Matbro was a brand of lifting equipment, popular with farmers. Matbro produced a wide range of all terrain forklifts and telescopic handlers in their distinctive yellow livery, using engines derived from Ford and Perkins. Matbro began operating at a loss in the late 1990s and in the end went under in 2003 after accounting issues in their parent company Powerscreen. The old designs were then sold to the tractor company John Deere, which sub-licensed them to heavy lifting company Terex, who continued to evolve the designs, with new ideas such as side-mounted engines instead of rear ones and hydrostatic drive.

== Origin ==
The company, named after its founders the Mathew brothers, produced forklift trucks in Horley in Surrey, England. Between 1964 and 1971 a range of forklifts carrying loads of 8000 lb to 17,765 lb, named the Yard Model and the Compact Model were produced. These used axles made by GKN Centrax at Newton Abbot in Devon, under licence from the Rockwell-Standard. The frequent failure of axles supplied by Centrax for loads heavier than recommended by Rockwell led to a legal case which eventually went before Lord Denning in the Court of Appeal of England and Wales. This model with pivot steering and equal sized wheels was the basis of the first radial arm machines, the RAM40 with 40 cwt (2 imperial tons) lift capacity, produced c.1980. This was soon improved with a telescopic boom, producing the Teleram 40. These compact machines with the operator sitting above the automatic gearbox and just in front of the engine proved popular with farmers for their ability to go almost anywhere and do a wide range of jobs, while being able to manoeuvre in confined spaces.
