= SGN (company) =

British gas distribution company

Scotia Gas Networks Limited
- Company type: Private
- Industry: Gas
- Founded: 2005
- Headquarters: Horley, England, UK
- Area served: Scotland and the south of England
- Key people: Simon Kilonback (CEO)
- Products: Gas distribution
- Owners: Brookfield Infrastructure Partners (37.5%); Ontario Teachers’ Pension Plan Board (37.5%); Global Infrastructure Partners (25%)
- Number of employees: 3,816
- Website: www.sgn.co.uk

SGN (previously Scotia Gas Networks) is a British gas distribution company. It manages natural and green gas distribution networks in Scotland and in the south of England. As of 2014/15 SGN operates more than 44,000 miles (71,000 km) of pipes. In the same period, SGN spent £500 million on upgrading the network.

== History ==
The company was formed in 2005 as Scotia Gas Networks. From that year, it was 50% owned by SSE plc. In September 2014 it was renamed SGN.

In 2014, SGN was awarded funding from the industry regulator, Ofgem, to develop two projects. "Opening up the Gas Market" is an investigation into whether the British Gas Safety Regulations could be changed to accept different types of gas. "Robotics" is a project to develop technology for repairing steel mains without interrupting the gas.

SSE sold 16.7% of the company to the Abu Dhabi Investment Authority in 2016.

In March 2021, SSE sold its remaining one-third share for £1225 million, and the Abu Dhabi Investment Authority sold its one-sixth holding. The purchasers were the Ontario Teachers' Pension Plan, which increased its stock holding from 25% to 37.5%, and Brookfield Infrastructure Partners, which bought 37.5%; the Ontario Municipal Employees Retirement System retained its 25% holding, which in December 2021 it sold to the American private equity firm Global Infrastructure Partners. The financial terms of the sale were not disclosed, but The Globe and Mail reported the price was 1.6 billion Canadian dollars.

In September 2020, the company commissioned Wood to create a "decarbonisation roadmap" for the north-east and east coast of Scotland.

== Thornton Heath gas explosion ==
A gas explosion in Croydon, London, on 8 August 2022 resulted in the death of a 4-year-old girl, Sahara Salman. Several other local residents were seriously injured. SGN was reported to have been notified of the gas leak on 30 July.
