= Henry Ernest Milner =

English engineer and landscape architect (1845–1906)

Henry Ernest Milner (18 April 1845 – 10 March 1906) was an English civil engineer and landscape architect.

== Personal life ==
He was the son of landscape architect Edward Milner and his wife, Elizabeth Mary Kelly, who had eleven children, of whom Henry Ernest was the eldest, born in Liverpool on 18 April 1845. He was educated by private tutor in Germany and France. In 1869 he married Mary Dickey, daughter of Canadian Senator Robert B. Dickey. The couple had two children: a son, Barry Ernest, and a daughter, Winifred; she married Edward White who was trained in, and ultimately took over, his father-in-law's landscape architecture practice.

== Career ==
Milner's working career started in London during 1862 when he was employed by Morton Peto. He remained in London until 1864 when he travelled to Russia on an assignment to carry out work on railways as an assistant engineer. During 1868 he moved to Nova Scotia, where he was the resident engineer on the Windsor and Annapolis Railway. He worked with his father's company after returning to England, becoming a full partner in 1881. Among the commissions he undertook were: Ashtead Park; Victoria Park in Glossop; and Overtoun Bridge in West Dunbartonshire for Lord Overtoun. He was elected to membership of the Institution of Civil Engineers in 1878. Working abroad again by 1885, he was commissioned by Count Tasziló Festetics to redesign the landscaping around the recently expanded Festetics Palace in Keszthely, Hungary. He returned several years later, in 1893, to do further work. Around 1895 Milner was trading from a business address in Westminster, London.

Following the 1890 publication of his book, The Art and Practice of Landscape Gardening, Milner was hired to plan several notable projects. These included the designs for the 250 acre grounds surrounding Sir Edward Watkin's tower at Wembley Park; although the gardens, which incorporated architectural features like a fountain, were completed, financial constraints and problems with the foundations of the tower meant only the first level was built and that was knocked down in 1907. He was also commissioned to design the gardens at Friar Park for Sir Frank Crisp and the parterre, Pleasure Gardens and Old World Garden at Gatton Park under instructions from Sir Jeremiah Colman.

In 1897 the Royal Horticultural Society initiated an award for British horticulturists, styled as the Victoria Medal of Honour, to be given to people the officials of the society "considered deserving of special honour". Milner is listed as one of the first sixty individuals awarded it. Two years later, in 1899, he was presented with the Swedish North Star award for several contracts he had undertaken in the Royal Gardens.

== Death and legacy ==
Milner died at his home, 119 Gipsy Hill, Norwood, on 10 March 1906. He is buried in Darley.
