= Archway Theatre =

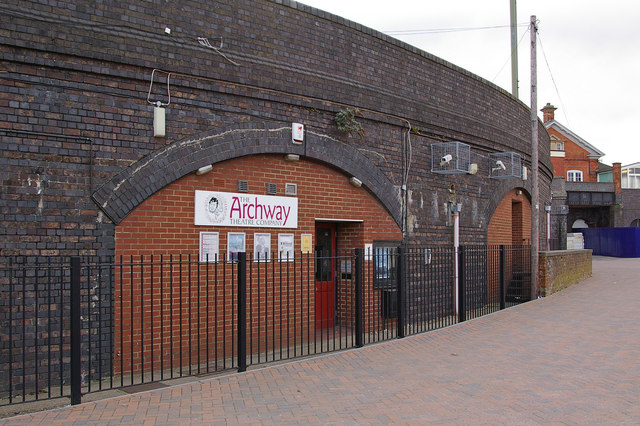
- Front Entrance of Archway Theatre, Horley
- Interactive map of Archway Theatre
- Address: The Drive; Horley, Surrey, UK
- Coordinates: 51.1691°N 0.1616°W
- Owner: Archway Theatre Company
- Capacity: 95
- Type: Theatre

Construction
- Opened: 1952
- Years active: 72

Website
- Archway website

The Archway Theatre is a unique amateur theatre based in Horley, Surrey, United Kingdom. It is operated by a membership organisation, the Archway Theatre Company. It consists of a 95 seat main auditorium and a 40 seat studio complex.

The group performs 10 main productions each year of 10 performances each over a 2-week period. The choice of productions is wide and varied and in 2012 included works by William Shakespeare, Martin McDonagh, Alan Ayckbourn, Alan Bennett and Arthur Miller.

== Building ==
The Archway is hosted, as its name suggests, underneath the Victoria Road railway arches in Horley, which were built in 1909 when a road bridge was built over the railway in Horley. Originally the theatre was fitted under the width of the roadway and could only seat 65, but the auditorium was expanded and refurbished in 1989 to provide the current capacity of 95.

The Studio complex is hosted in a separate set of arches, right next to the station, and combines the Studio Auditorium, rehearsal rooms, as well as a function room which is available for hire from the public.

== Productions ==
The Archway puts on ten main auditorium productions each year as well as a number of productions in the studio. It has also co-operated with other small theatres in the surrounding counties to produce, for the first time since 1936, a collection of ten Noël Coward plays.
