= Gatton Park =

Country estate in Surrey, England

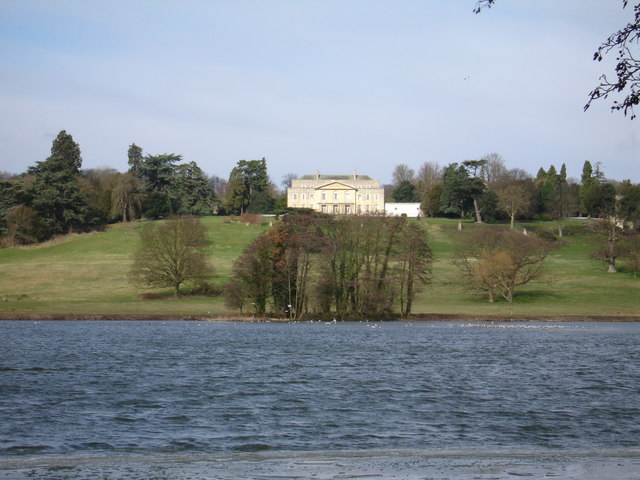
- Gatton Hall surrounded by Gatton Park

- Location within Surrey
- 51°15′32″N 0°10′21″W
- Type: Country estate
- Location: Gatton, Surrey
- OS grid reference: TQ2749052824

Listed Building – Grade II
- Official name: Gatton Hall
- Designated: 31 March 1977
- Reference no.: 1377943

National Register of Historic Parks and Gardens
- Official name: Lower Gatton Park
- Designated: 7 December 1998
- Reference no.: 1001409

Listed Building – Grade I
- Official name: Church of St Andrew
- Designated: 19 October 1951
- Reference no.: 1294726

Listed Building – Grade II*
- Official name: Gatton Town Hall
- Designated: 19 October 1951
- Reference no.: 1029114

Gatton Park is a country estate set in parkland landscaped by Capability Brown and gardens by Henry Ernest Milner and Edward White at Gatton, near Reigate in Surrey, England.

Gatton Park is now partly owned by The Royal Alexandra and Albert School and partly by the National Trust. It comprises 500 acres (2.0 km^{2}) of manor, half on the school site and half on National Trust land. The property is Grade II listed. The park is Grade II listed on the Register of Historic Parks and Gardens.

Most of the park and gardens are closed to the public but opened on specific regular open days. There is an open National Trust trail on the west side of the original estate.

== History ==
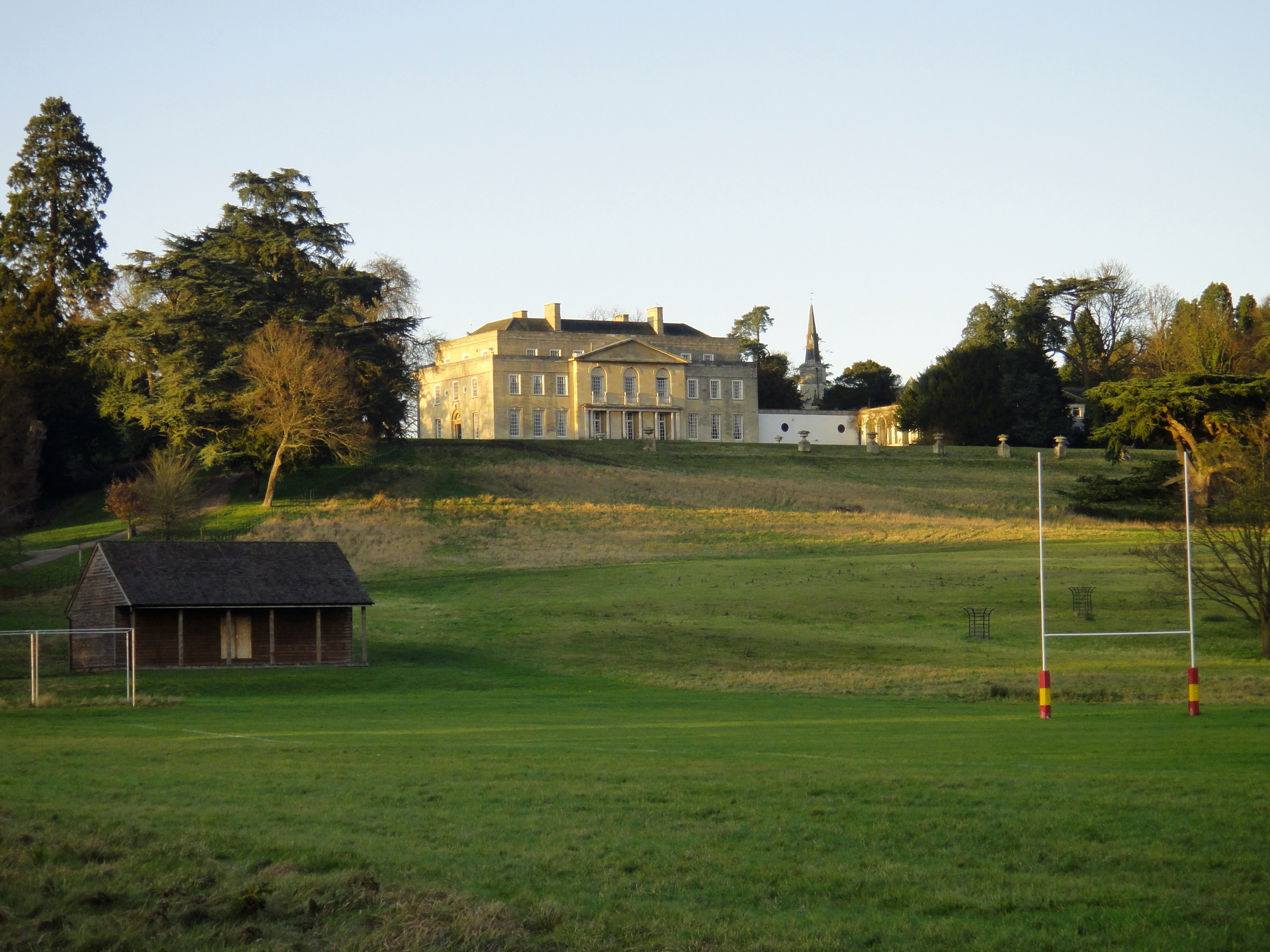
Gatton Park - Dec 2011 - The Big House

The manor's history can be traced to the Domesday Book of 1086. In 1449, John Timperley, steward to Henry VI, was given permission to enclose the land and, two years later, the manor was granted the privilege of sending two members to Parliament, which it retained, as a "rotten borough", until the Parliamentary reform of 1832. (Note: For this aspect of Gatton, see Gatton (UK Parliament constituency).) (Note: John Timperley had voted in favour of Henry VI's marriage to Margaret of Anjou.) During the reign of Henry VIII, Gatton was the property of the Crown.

The earliest known house is thought to have been constructed in the Tudor or Jacobean periods. Although there is no surviving mention of the building in historical records, it was discovered during archaeological investigations in the mid-1930s. On the same site as the current house, the external dimensions were around 27 m (90 ft) by 7 m (24 ft). Built of white sandstone, it had a symmetrical floor plan with two forward-projecting wings. Beneath the west wing was a small, brick-built chamber, which may had been used as a strong room or safe deposit for valuable items. The archaeologist, S. E. Winbolt, who investigated the site, suggested that this early house might have been constructed during a time of religious persecution.

In the 17th century, the house is mentioned as being in the possession of John Weston of Sutton Place, Surrey, the second and eldest surviving son of Sir Richard III Weston) and his wife, Mary Copley (daughter and heiress of William Copley of Gatton) until 1654.

Following the death of the previous owner, William Newland, in 1749, James Colebrooke acquired Gatton Park in 1751. He died ten years later and the estate passed to his brother, Sir George Colebrooke, who employed Capability Brown to landscape the estate between 1762 and 1768. To create the lakes, Colebrooke appropriated around 40 acres (16 ha) of glebe land and damned the tributaries of the River Mole that ran across it.

In 1789 Thomas Kingscote went to live at Gatton Park after his friend, Robert Ladbroke, had bought it in the same year. It was a notorious pocket borough and Thomas went there in order to manage the election of Ladbroke's nominees. Ladbroke bought it from the Graham family. In 1809, Richard Maliphant carried out repairs of the house for Henry Harpur-Crewe, who was renting the property at the time.

In 1830, Gatton was purchased by Frederick John Monson, 5th Baron Monson (1809–1841), for £100,000, for the ancient privilege of sending two members to the House of Commons, a perquisite that was cancelled two years later, "and all Lord Monson had for £100,000 was the land". He set about remaking Gatton Hall splendid: for him Thomas Hopper made alterations to Gatton, but further plans were not executed. The marble hall at the centre of the main block was revetted in marble, even to the inlaid marbles of its floor, taking as a general model the Corsini Chapel in San Giovanni in Laterano, though Lord Monson did not cap his hall with a dome. The walls were frescoed by Joseph Severn with the Four Classical Virtues, embodied by historical ladies.

In 1841 the estate was inherited by the 6th Baron Monson who lived in Lincolnshire and who let Gatton, first to his aunt and then to Hugh Cairns, 1st Earl Cairns, the Attorney General.

Between 1888 and 1942, Gatton Park was owned by Sir Jeremiah Colman whose family had established the Colman's mustard food brand in the early 19th century. In February 1934, a fire destroyed much of the house. The house was rebuilt under the supervision of Edwin Cooper, using stone reclaimed from the destroyed building. The main portico, bronze gates and a statue entitled The Athlete in Repose had survived intact and were incorporated into the new structure. Construction work was completed in 1936. Colman died in January 1942.

The property was requisitioned during the Second World War for the Canadian Army and the Royal Military Police. Part of the estate was purchased in 1948 for the Royal Alexandra and Albert School, which is now a state boarding school. 108 acres of woodland was given to the National Trust in 1951 by Colman's son, also called Jeremiah Colman.

== St Andrew's Church ==
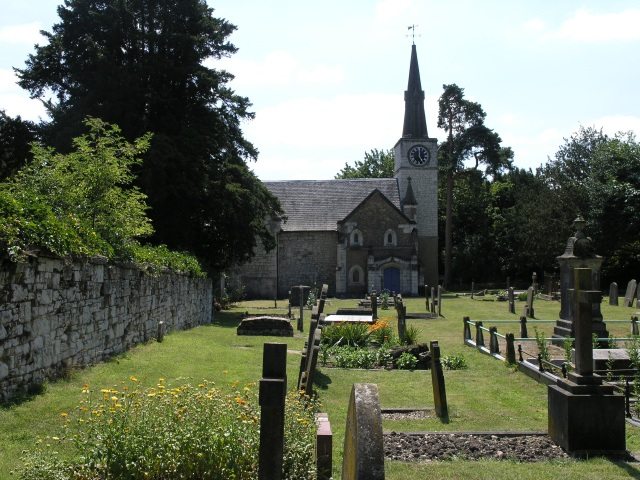
St Andrew's Church, Gatton showing grave of Jeremiah Coleman (large headstone far right)

Near the hall stands the 13th-century St Andrew's Church, a Grade I listed building. The church, essentially a chapel for the estate that is reached from the house by a covered walkway, was richly improved within its simple exterior with imported woodwork in 1834: the pulpit and altar, bought from Nuremberg, were optimistically attributed at the time to Albrecht Dürer; the carved doors came from Rouen; the presbytery stalls from a disestablished monastery in Ghent, (Note: When a party from the Surrey Archaeological Society visited in 1850, "Gatton church, as restored by the late Lord Monson, was much admired. The fittings of the interior were mostly purchased by his lordship in Belgium, during the confusion of the revolution of 1830, and thus rescued from further desecration.") the altar rails came from Tongeren; stained glass for the windows, and the wainscoting of the nave and carved canopies came from Aarschot, near Leuven.

The Gothic screen at the west end came from an unidentified English church, where it had been dismantled and was about to be burnt. "Gatton, rebuilt in the 1830s, is a bijou" reported Nikolaus Pevsner "perhaps the best example in the country of the tendency for the church to become an extension of the landlord's parlour or sculpture gallery." In 1930, stones from the structure were removed by Sir Jeremiah Colman and the contemporary rector of Gatton and given to Colorado College of Colorado Springs, Colorado in the United States to be incorporated into the structure of the Eugene Percy Shove Memorial Chapel in honour of the donor's ancestor, Edward Shove, who was rector of Gatton from 1615 to 1646.

== Other features of the park ==
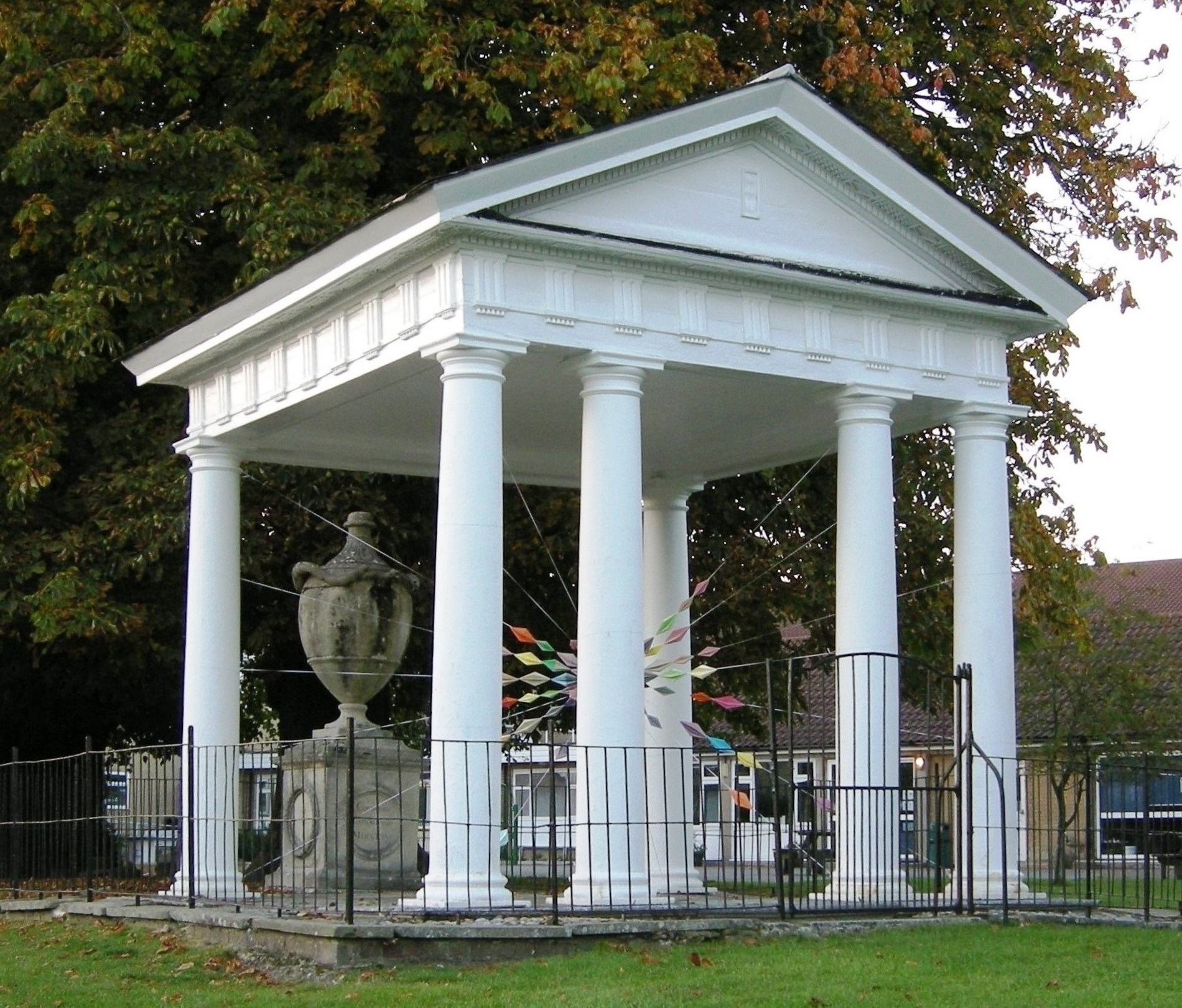
Gatton Town Hall

Gatton Town Hall is a Grade II* listed ornamental garden temple. Attributed to the architect, Robert Taylor, it consists of a pedimented roof, supported by six cast iron Doric columns. It is the place where, prior to 1832, the tiny electorate of the Gatton rotten borough voted in their two members of Parliament. Behind the structure is a stone urn, carved with serpents entwined, on a deep moulded plinth inscribed "in memory of the deceased Borough".

During the 1860s, Colman commissioned Henry Ernest Milner to design the parterre, Pleasure Gardens and Old World Garden. Milner's son in law Edward White created the Rock Garden with James Pulham and Son and the Japanese garden for Colman. Both gardens were restored in the late-1990s.

The school dormitories, to the north of the house, were designed by Adams, Gray and Adamson in 1954. The same firm designed the school chapel two years later.

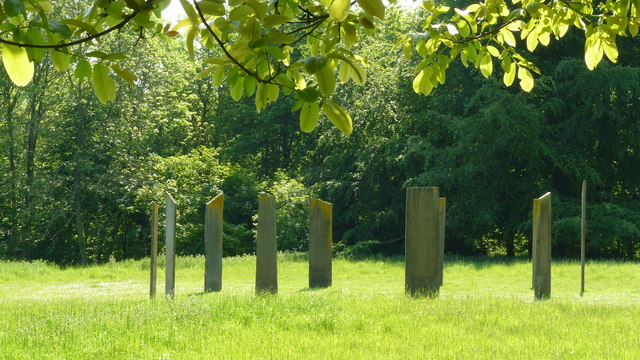
The Millennium Stones in Gatton Park.

In the park, and accessible from the public footpath, is a stone circle called The Millennium Stones created by the sculptor Richard Kindersley to mark the double millennium in 2000. It is made from flat Caithness flagstones quarried in the far north of Scotland near Thurso. The first stone in the series is inscribed with the words from St John's Gospel, "in the beginning the word was". The other nine stones are carved with quotations contemporary with each 200 year segment of the 2000 year period, ending with the words of T.S. Eliot: "At the still point of the turning world. Neither flesh nor fleshless; Neither from nor towards; at the still point, there the dance is, But neither arrest nor movement."

== Bibliography ==
- Colvin, Howard (2008). A Biographical Dictionary of British Architects, 1600-1840 (4th ed.). New Haven: Yale University Press. ISBN 978-0-30-012508-5.
- Fuller, Timothy; Seay, Albert (1981). This glorious and transcendant place : A brief account of the Shove Memorial Chapel, its stained glass windows, its ceiling paintings, based on a manuscript by the architect, John Gray (PDF). Colorado Springs: Colorado College. ISBN 0-9350-5205-4.
- Harrison, Frederick (1899). Annals of an Old Manor House: Sutton Place, Guildford.
- Manning, Owen; Bray, William (1974) [1809]. The history and antiquities of the county of Surrey. Vol. II. London: John White & Co. ISBN 0-85-409603-5.
- Nairn, Ian; Pevsner, Nikolaus; Cherry, Bridget (1971) [1962]. Surrey. The Buildings of England. New Haven: Yale University Press. ISBN 0-14-071021-3.
- O'Brien, Charles; Nairn, Ian; Cherry, Bridget (2022) [1962]. Surrey. The Buildings of England. New Haven: Yale University Press. ISBN 978-0-30-023478-7.
- Parker, Eric (1921) [1908]. Highways and Byways in Surrey (2nd ed.). London: Macmillan.
