= Trevor Grant (cricketer) =

English cricketer

Personal information
- Full name: Trevor John Duncan Grant
- Born: 24 May 1926; Charlwood, Surrey, England
- Died: 10 October 1957 (aged 31); Shotley Gate, Suffolk, England
- Batting: Right-handed

Domestic team information
- Years: Team
- 1946: Sussex

Career statistics
Competition	First-class
Matches	1
Runs scored	6
Batting average	3.00
100s/50s	–/–
Top score	6
Balls bowled	–
Wickets	–
Bowling average	–
5 wickets in innings	–
10 wickets in match	–
Best bowling	–
Catches/stumpings	1/–
- Source: Cricinfo, 27 November 2011

Trevor John Duncan Grant (24 May 1926 – 10 October 1957) was an English cricketer. Grant was a right-handed opening batsman. He was born at Charlwood, Surrey.

Grant made a single first-class appearance for Sussex against Hampshire at Dean Park, Bournemouth in the 1946 County Championship. In Sussex's first-innings, he was dismissed for a duck by Lofty Herman. In their second-innings, he was dismissed for 6 runs by the same bowler. This was his only major appearance for Sussex.

Outside of cricket, Grant served in the Royal Navy, having attended the Britannia Royal Naval College in 1942. He died at Shotley Gate, Suffolk on 10 October 1957. Serving as a physical training officer for RNTE Shotley, Grant killed himself with a shotgun in his quarters.
