= Edward White (landscape architect) =

English landscape architect

Edward White (1873–1952) was an English landscape architect and garden designer. (Note: https://brookwoodcemetery.com/2020/12/01/edward-white/) He was a founder member of the Institute of Landscape Architects and president from 1931–1933. (Note: https://merl.reading.ac.uk/collections/milner-white/) He was married to Winifrid, daughter of Henry Ernest Milner, with whom he was partners in the firm of Milner, White & Son.

== Personal life ==
Edward White was born in Worthing on 14 July 1872. He worked as a surveyor at HC Barts in Worthing. His work took him in 1899 to Crystal Palace where he met landscape architect Henry Ernest Milner. After becoming a partner in the company, in 1900 White married Milner's daughter Winifred.

Edward and Winifred had three children - Leslie Milner White, Anna White and J Grant White. Leslie later became a Landscape Architect and took over Milner, White and Sons.

== Career ==
Projects led by White that exist today include:

The Japanese Garden and Rock Garden at Gatton Park, Surrey for Jeremiah Colman

The Rock Garden and William Wilks Entrance Gates at Wisley, Surrey.

Memorial Gardens at Stoke Poges, Buckinghamshire.

Glades of Remembrance at Brookwood Cemetery, Surrey, his last major work, dedicated in 1950. White's memorial stone lies here following his death in 1952.

Coleton Fishacre, Devon working with architect Oswald Milne for Lady Dorathea and Rupert D'Oyly Carte in the mid 1920s.

Edward White was a key Landscape Architect involved in major exhibitions:

- White was Honorable Managing Director of the International Horticultural Festival at Chelsea in 1912 (with Jeremiah Colman as Treasurer). This is considered the precursor of RHS Chelsea Flower Show. It started in 1913 on the same site, with White as a director.
- White designed the gardens at the British Empire Exhibition of 1924 and 1925 at Wembley, London. This is the event where Wembley Stadium was inaugurated as the home of English football.
