= Charlwood =

Village and parish in Surrey, England

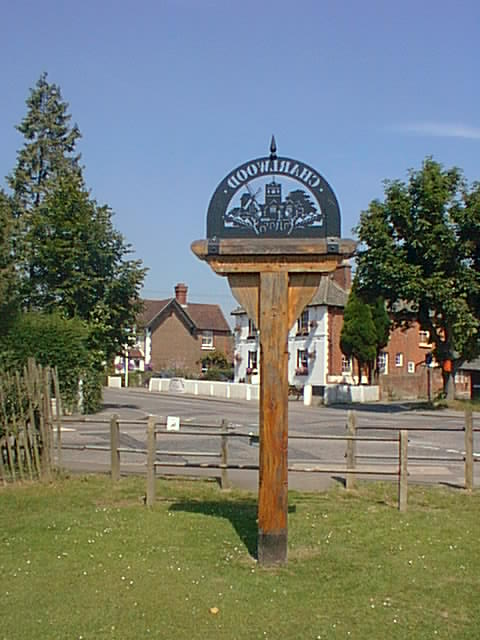
- Charlwood village sign on 'The Rec', with the Rising Sun pub in the background

- Location within Surrey
- Area: 14.56 km^{2} (5.62 sq mi)
- Population: 2,337 (Civil Parish)
  - Density: 161/km^{2} (420/sq mi)
- OS grid reference: TQ2441
  - London: 28 mi (45 km) N
- Civil parish: Charlwood
- District: Mole Valley
- Shire county: Surrey
- Region: South East
- Country: England
- Sovereign state: United Kingdom
- Post town: Horley
- Postcode district: RH6
- Dialling code: 01293
- Police: Surrey
- Fire: Surrey
- Ambulance: South East Coast
- UK Parliament: Dorking and Horley

Charlwood is a village and civil parish in the Mole Valley district of Surrey, England. It is immediately north-west of London Gatwick Airport in West Sussex, close west of Horley and north of Crawley. The historic county boundary between Surrey and Sussex ran to the south of Gatwick Airport. Boundaries were reformed in 1974 with the county boundary between Surrey and West Sussex, delineated by the Sussex Border Path, running along the northern perimeter of the airport, and the southern extent of Charlwood.

== Geography ==
A narrow ridge of Sussex Marble runs through the west of the parish, where it is followed for a distance by the Sussex Border Path. Elevations range from 60 to 140 metres (200 feet to 460 feet) above sea level. No dual carriageways bisect the area and London Gatwick Airport has its perimeter immediately to the south-west.

=== Climate ===
Climate data for Charlwood (1991–2020)
Month	Jan	Feb	Mar	Apr	May	Jun	Jul	Aug	Sep	Oct	Nov	Dec	Year
Mean daily maximum °C (°F)	7.8 (46.0)	8.4 (47.1)	11.2 (52.2)	14.5 (58.1)	17.7 (63.9)	20.8 (69.4)	23.1 (73.6)	22.7 (72.9)	19.5 (67.1)	15.3 (59.5)	11.1 (52.0)	8.2 (46.8)	15.0 (59.0)
Mean daily minimum °C (°F)	1.5 (34.7)	1.4 (34.5)	2.7 (36.9)	4.2 (39.6)	7.1 (44.8)	9.9 (49.8)	11.9 (53.4)	11.8 (53.2)	9.5 (49.1)	7.1 (44.8)	3.9 (39.0)	1.7 (35.1)	6.1 (43.0)
Average rainfall mm (inches)	90.3 (3.56)	64.4 (2.54)	53.6 (2.11)	52.4 (2.06)	54.8 (2.16)	50.6 (1.99)	54.7 (2.15)	60.4 (2.38)	64.7 (2.55)	94.3 (3.71)	97.1 (3.82)	95.9 (3.78)	833.6 (32.82)
Average rainy days (≥ 1 mm)	13.1	10.8	9.4	9.7	8.9	8.7	8.4	9.2	9.1	12.5	13.1	12.8	126.2
Mean monthly sunshine hours	53.4	75.4	119.3	171.4	206.3	209.7	215.9	199.0	156.0	110.6	65.2	45.8	1,628.4
Source: Met Office

== History ==
=== Before 1800 ===
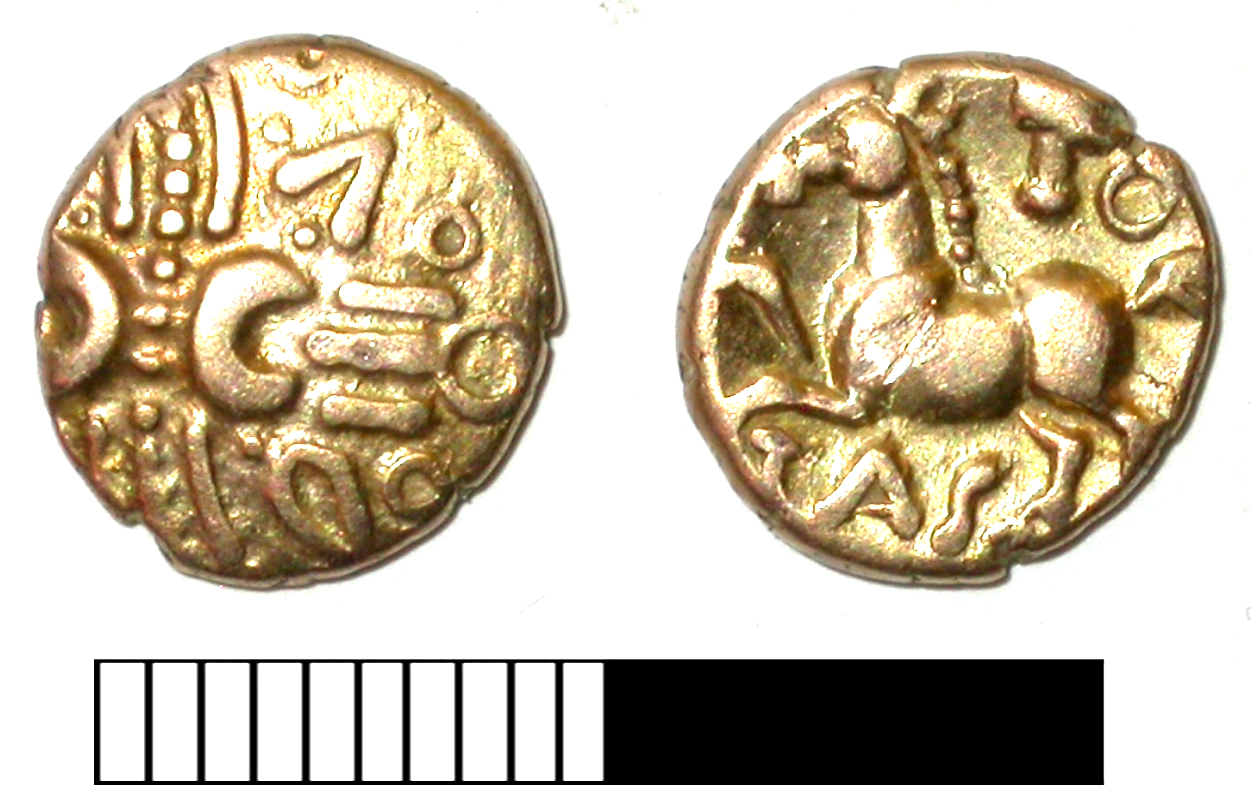
A gold Iron Age quarter stater coin, found in Charlwood in 2011 (Note: The coin is thought to have been issued by Tasciovanus, king of the Catuvellauni from c. 20 BCE to c. 10 CE)

The village anciently lay within the Reigate Hundred. Its variant spellings from such medieval records as the Feet of fines include: Cherlewude (13th century); Cherlwude (that century and the next, when Chorlwode also appeared). After this Charlewood appears commonly in 18th-century records.

The place is not mentioned in the Domesday Book of 1086, and was probably a forest district of the manor of Merstham, Surrey which until shortly after 1911 reached into the parish. In the medieval period this was held by Christchurch Priory. About 1890 a vessel of Paludina Limestone (Sussex 'marble') was found on the estate of Mr. Young, Stan Hill/Stanhill, which the finders regarded as an ancient font, but which was perhaps a stone mortar. Charlwood Place is a 16th-century listed moated house situated on the northwestern perimeter of the village. The mother of John Pitseus, a recusant Bishop in France, lived there.

A historic cricket match was held in Charlwood in June 1741. This was Surrey v London and won by the county team. The match is the only time that Charlwood features in surviving cricket records.

=== After 1800 ===
Total enclosure (of the common land) took place in phases: in 1843, 1844 and 1854, including of Johnson's Common and White's Common, once said to be infertile land. Lowfield Heath was in the parish and was enclosed in 1846. Charlwood's cottage hospital opened in 1873 but was closed in 1911. Charlwood Boys' School was built in 1840. Charlwood Girls' and Infants' School was built in 1852 and enlarged in 1893.

Lowfield Heath School was built in 1868. Gatwick Racecourse, opened in 1891, after the closing of the Croydon Racecourse at Woodside, Croydon.

A move of Charlwood from Surrey to West Sussex was included in the Local Government Act 1974. This was prevented by the Charlwood and Horley Act 1974, ensuring it stayed in Surrey.

== Governance ==
Charlwood is in the Mole Valley District which co-administers local services with Surrey County Council. Additional local amenities are provided, with Hookwood, by its (civil) parish council.

== Landmarks ==
=== Lowfield Heath Windmill ===
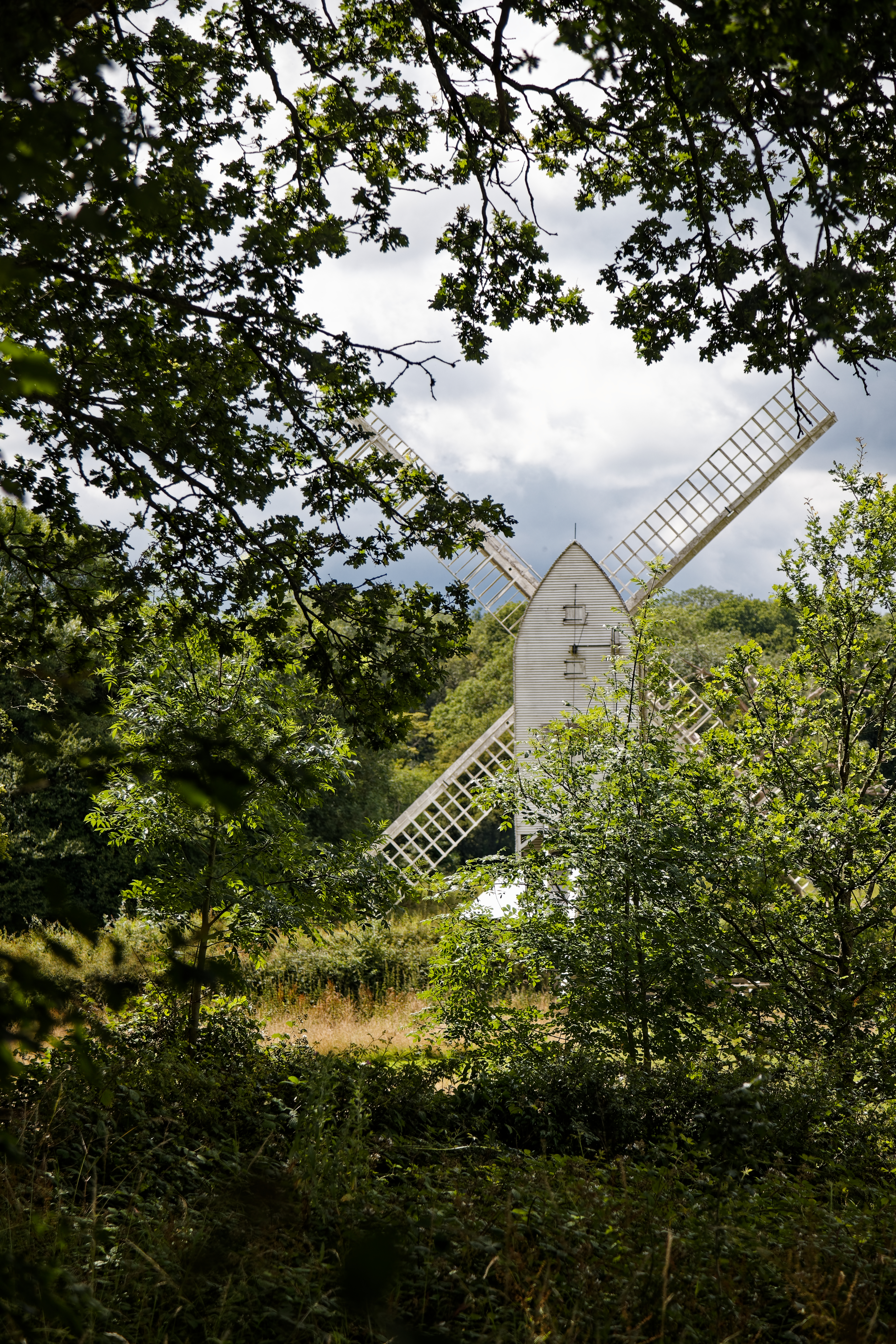
Lowfield Heath Windmill

Charlwood's western limestone escarpment is the home of this windmill, which was moved from the village of Lowfield Heath when it was threatened with demolition in the 1970s, part of which took place to that village to accommodate Gatwick Airport's growth.

=== Church ===
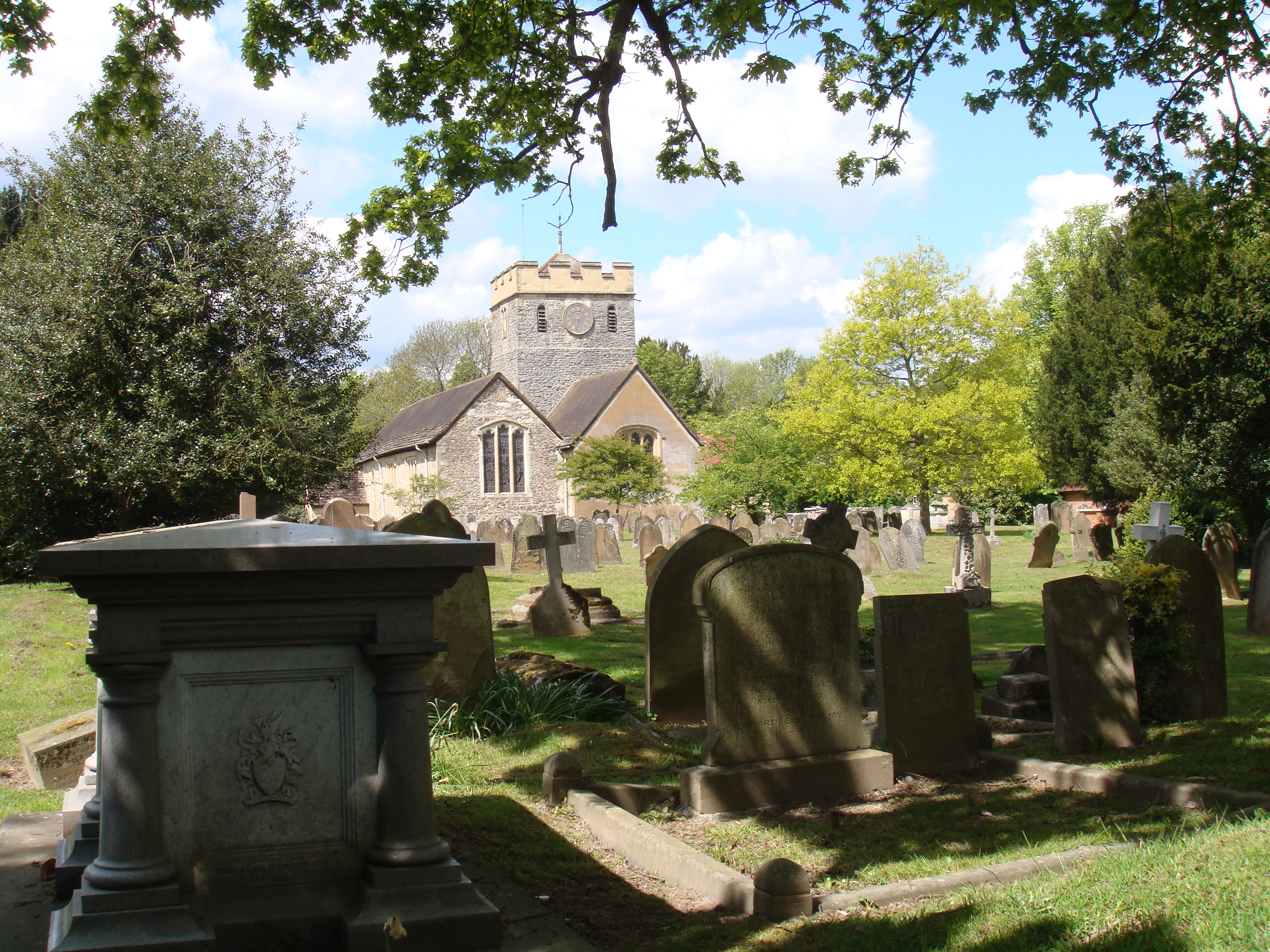
Church of St Nicholas

St Nicholas's is a Grade I listed building with intact Norman era stones. It has a particularly historically significant series of murals on the south wall of the chancel, contemporary with the south aisle which has been dated as c. 1300. These include scenes from the story of St Margaret and St Nicholas, amongst others.

=== Providence Chapel ===
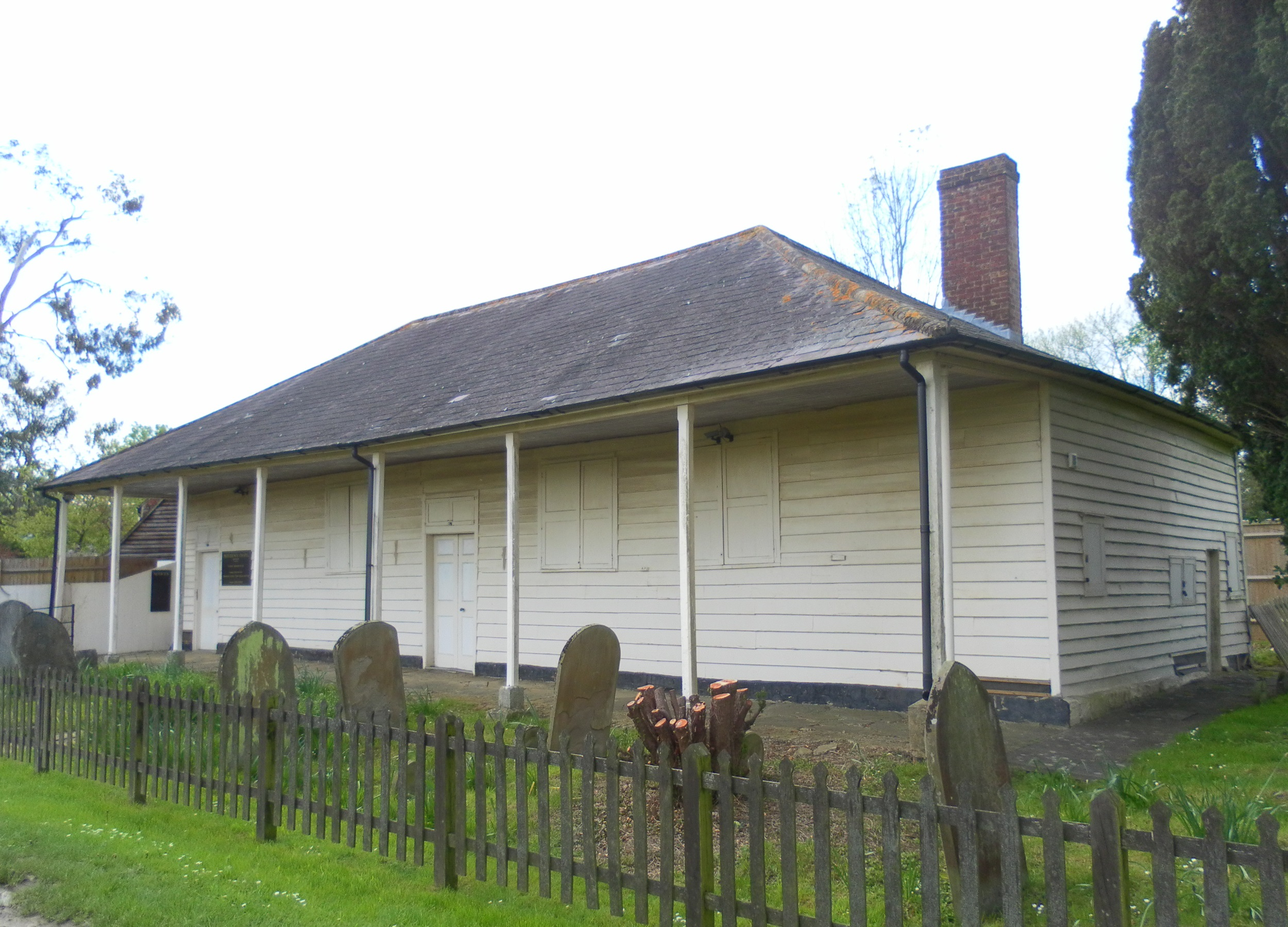
Providence Chapel, Charlwood

Providence Chapel, a Grade II* listed building, stands on a lane to the north of the village. The weatherboarded single-storey building was re-erected there in 1816 after being moved from Horsham, where it served as an officers' mess during the Napoleonic Wars. It was used as a Nonconformist chapel for almost 200 years, but was put up for sale in 2012.

It was bought by the Providence Chapel Charlwood Trust and restored with the aid of a grant from the Heritage Lottery Fund.

=== Gatwick Aviation Museum ===
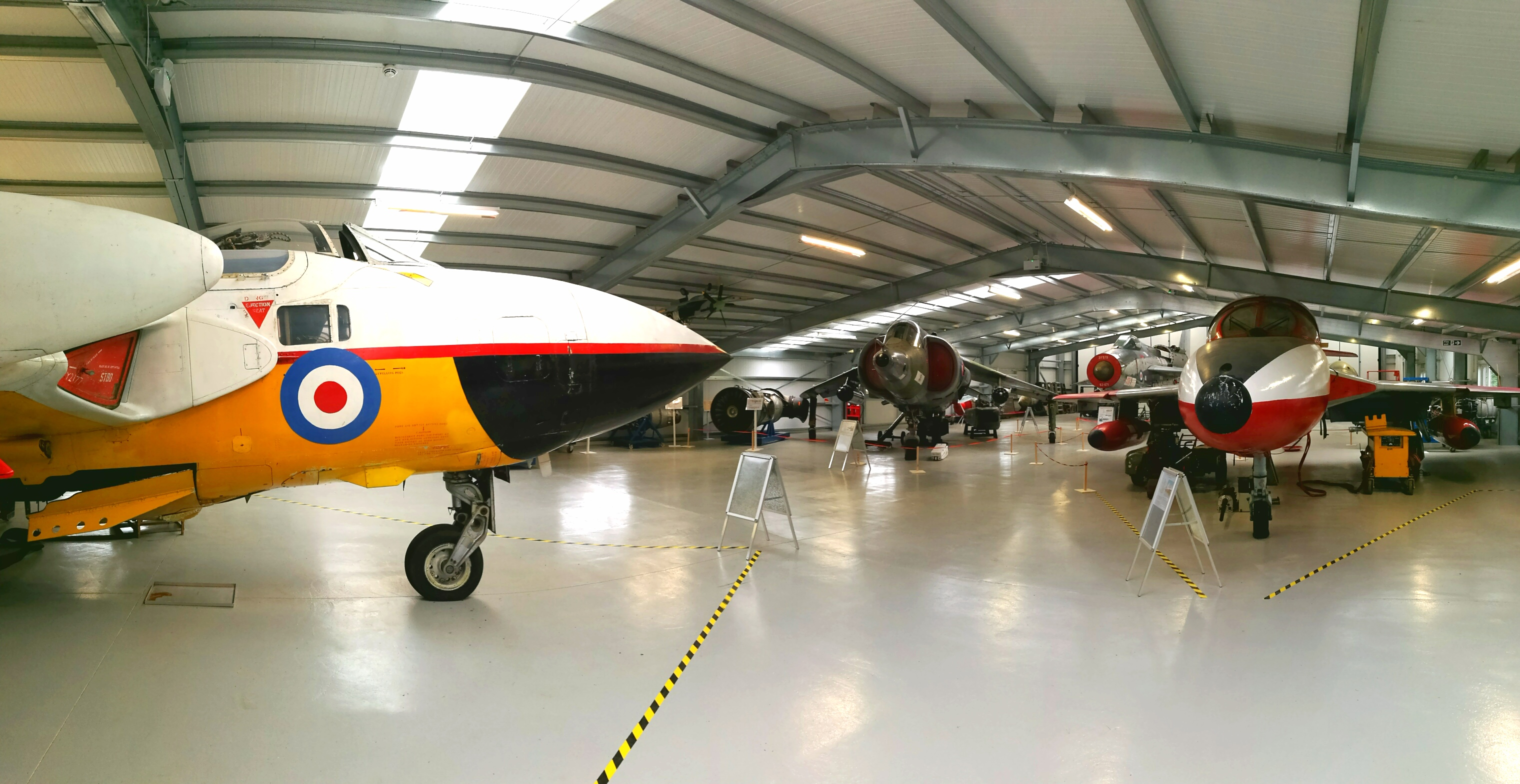
Inside, the main hangar at the museum

Gatwick Aviation Museum is located on the northwestern corner of Gatwick Airport. Started in 1987 as a private collection, the museum became a registered charity in 1999.

The museum has a varied collection of aircraft, aircraft engines and over 500 aircraft models, and also has displays and artefacts related to local aviation history particularly Gatwick Airport.

The museum and Central Sussex College cooperate to provide practical training for the students taking aerospace courses.

== Amenities ==
=== Park ===
The village is centred on the "rec", which comprises: a redeveloped children's playground, a sports pavilion, pitches of Charlwood F.C., who currently play intermediate football in the Mid Sussex Championship, and the Sunday side Charlwood Village F.C., as well as a cricket pitch used by Ifield Cricket Club.

In August 2019, YouTube channel "Bunch of Amateurs" began a series based around the Saturday football side named Charlwood FC Uncovered. The series follows the club and manager Peter Barkley and showcases what happens behind the scenes of a typical non-league English football club.

The village had its own cricket club, which closed in 2002. The ground is now used by Ifield Cricket Club.

=== Schools ===
The village has its own primary school, expanded from an infant school in 2016.

Charlwood is also home to the John Bristow and Thomas Mason Trust, which has its earliest origins in Charlwood's first school established in the early 17th-century, This building is still intact and owned by the Trust.

=== Hotels ===
The village has two hotels and several Bed and Breakfasts.

The hotels include Stanhill Court, built in 1881 as the home of William Young, a member of Lloyd's of London. In 1986 William Young's great-granddaughter converted the building into an 11 bedroom hotel. The hotel was subsequently sold and increased in bedroom and function room capacity with an additional wing.

=== SSSI ===
Glover's Wood, a Site of Special Scientific Interest is wholly within the west of Charlwood, and is noted for its bluebell displays in springtime.

== Localities ==
=== Hookwood ===
Hookwood 51.167°N 0.186°W is a clustered semi-agricultural 'village' in many contemporary definitions which is to the east starting at the southern tip of the A217, between Charlwood's centre and Horley. Hookwood Common was mentioned as 'still open ground' by the county topographer H. E. Malden in 1911, in the relevant Victoria County History. He also records that the misses Sanders who co-owned Hookwood House belonged to the old Sanders family of Charlwood. It is the most projecting settled part of the parish and its nearest amenities are equidistant, either those of economically important Horley or the smaller, more traditional amenities of Charlwood.

=== Russ Hill ===
Russ Hill 51.149°N 0.241°W is the area to the south west, a semi-agricultural and semi-wooded upland area which has the largest hotel in the civil parish of Charlwood. Reflecting its woodland, the statistical area extended to Norwood Hill (see below). Together these outlying parts had a population of 416 across 8.63 square kilometres (3.33 sq mi) as at the 2011 UK Census.

=== Norwood Hill ===
Norwood Hill 51.177°N 0.227°W is spread around a crossroads, closest to which is a pub. It is to the north and shares its single statistical output area with Russ Hill above. It has nearest access to the basic amenities of Charlwood in the same way, as well as the much larger amenities of Horley to the east of the parish in social and leisure and employment of Horley and the Borough of Crawley in terms of its economy other than farming and retirement properties which together accounted for a minority of the population as at the 2011 Census.

== Demography and housing ==
2011 Census Homes
Output area	Detached	Semi-detached	Terraced	Flats and apartments	Caravans/temporary/mobile homes	shared between households
(Civil Parish)	379	302	167	56	7	0

The average level of accommodation in the region composed of detached houses was 28%, the average that was apartments was 22.6%.

2011 Census Key Statistics
Output area	Population	Households	% Owned outright	% Owned with a loan	hectares
(Civil Parish)	2,326	911	29.6%	44.9%	1,456

The proportion of households in the civil parish which owned their home outright compares to the regional average of 35.1%. The proportion which owned their home with a loan compares to the regional average of 32.5%. The remaining % is made up of rented dwellings (plus a negligible % of households living rent-free).

== Notable people ==
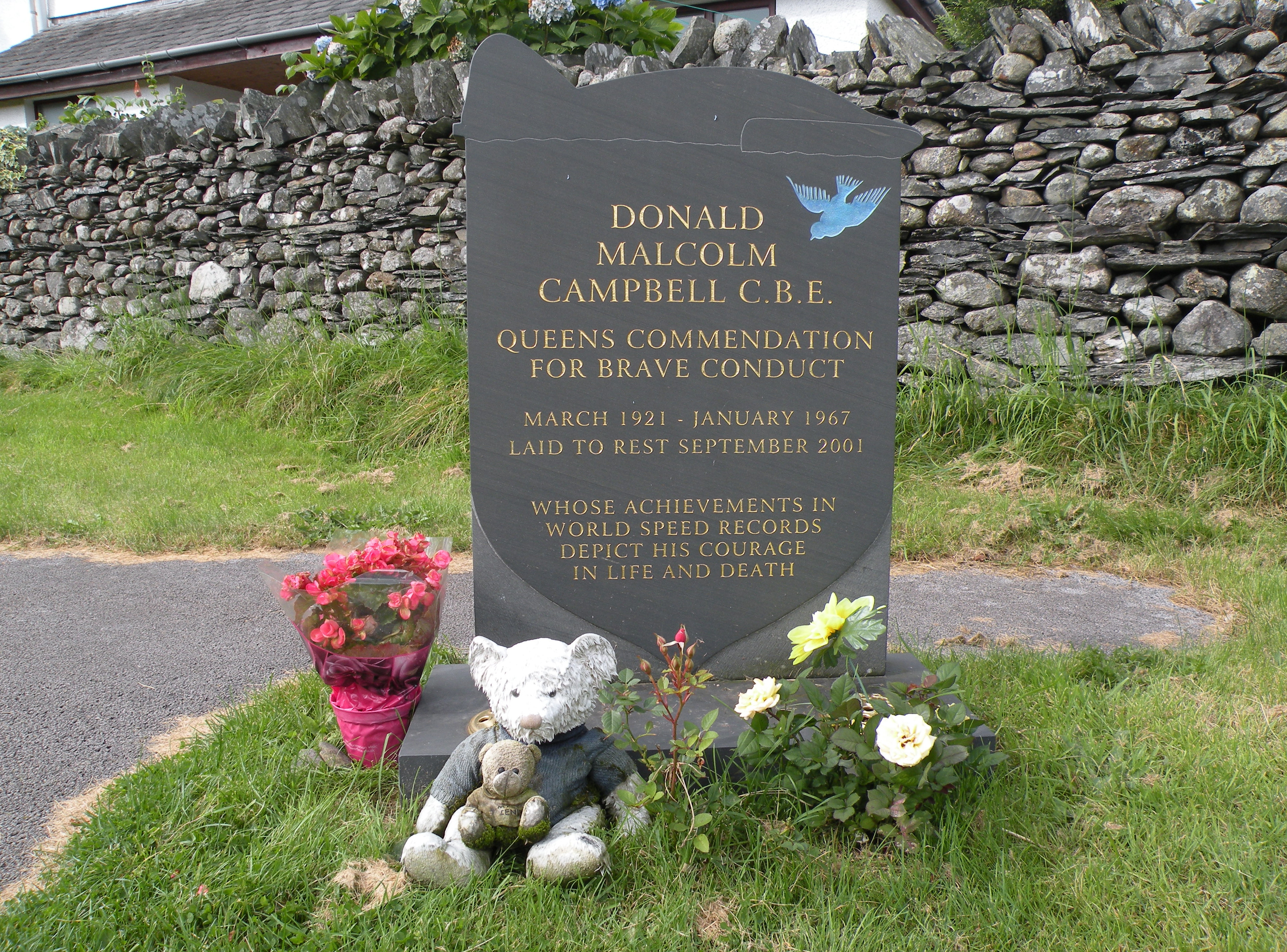
Donald Campbell's gravestone in Coniston

- Donald Campbell, previous Land speed record and Water speed record holder, may have been born at, and certainly lived at, Povey Cross in Hookwood at the eastern end of Charlwood parish.
- Sir Malcolm Campbell, racing driver and record holder, father of Donald, lived at Povey Cross House, in Hookwood
- Charles Cardell, a pagan priest, lived at Dumbledene estate in Charlwood.
- Don Charlwood, Australian-born author and aviator, visited the village during the war and discovered that his ancestors were buried in the cemetery there.
- Phil Creswick, member of the boyband Big Fun
- Trevor Grant, English cricketer.
- Billy Monger, British Formula 3 racing driver and TV presenter, survived a huge accident at Donington Park in Derbyshire in 2017, which lost him both of his lower legs.
- Nicholas Sanders, an English Catholic priest and polemicist.
- Barry Sheene, former British World Champion of Grand Prix motorcycle racing lived in Charlwood before his move to Australia in the late 1980s.
- E H Shepard, illustrator of Winnie the Pooh, lived for a time with his sister in Charlwood.
- David Sheppard, Baron Sheppard of Liverpool, Bishop of Liverpool, England cricket captain was brought up in Charlwood.
- George Street, English cricketer
- Martyn Wyndham-Read, folk singer, collector and singer of Australian folk music.

== See also ==
- Gatwick Aviation Museum
- List of places of worship in Mole Valley
