= Horley =

Town in Surrey, England

Coordinates: 51°10′26″N 0°10′19″W

- Town
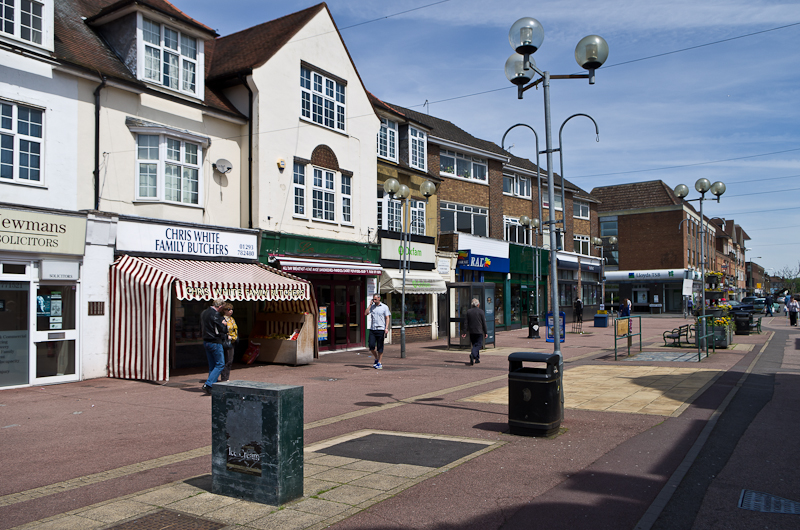
- High Street, Horley

- Location within Surrey
- Area: 11.24 km^{2} (4.34 sq mi)
- Population: 22,076 (civil parish, 2011) or 22,693 (built-up area)
  - Density: 1,964/km^{2} (5,090/sq mi)
- OS grid reference: TQ2843
- Civil parish: Horley
- District: Reigate and Banstead
- Shire county: Surrey
- Region: South East
- Country: England
- Sovereign state: United Kingdom
- Post town: Horley
- Postcode district: RH6
- Dialling code: 01293
- Police: Surrey
- Fire: Surrey
- Ambulance: South East Coast
- UK Parliament: Dorking and Horley

Horley is a town in the borough of Reigate and Banstead in Surrey, England, south of the towns of Reigate and Redhill. The county border with West Sussex is to the south with Crawley and Gatwick Airport close to the town.

It has its own economy that comprises business parks and a shopping centre with a long high street. Because of its position, it has good commuter links to London and other surrounding towns.

== Toponymy ==
The first written record of Horley is a charter from the late-12th century, in which it appears as Horle. In 1203, it is recorded as Horleg and in 1219 as Horlei. In the 13th century, it appears as Horleia, Hornle and Hornly, and in 1428 as Horneele. The second half of the name, –ley, derives from Old English: leah meaning a woodland or clearing. The first part may indicate ownership by a person called "Horne" or that the land was horn-shaped.

== History ==
In the past the Weald was a densely forested and water-logged clay area. During Saxon times, the Manor of Horley came under the control of the Benedictine Abbey of St Peter at Chertsey. In the Domesday Book of 1086, the Manor was within the hundred known as Cherchefelle which in 1199 became known as Reigate. The Manor passed to Henry VIII on the dissolution of the monasteries in 1539 and changed hands several times during the next sixty years.

About 1 mile (1.6 km) to the east is the overgrown but well-preserved site of Thunderfield Castle, a twelfth-century motte and bailey castle.

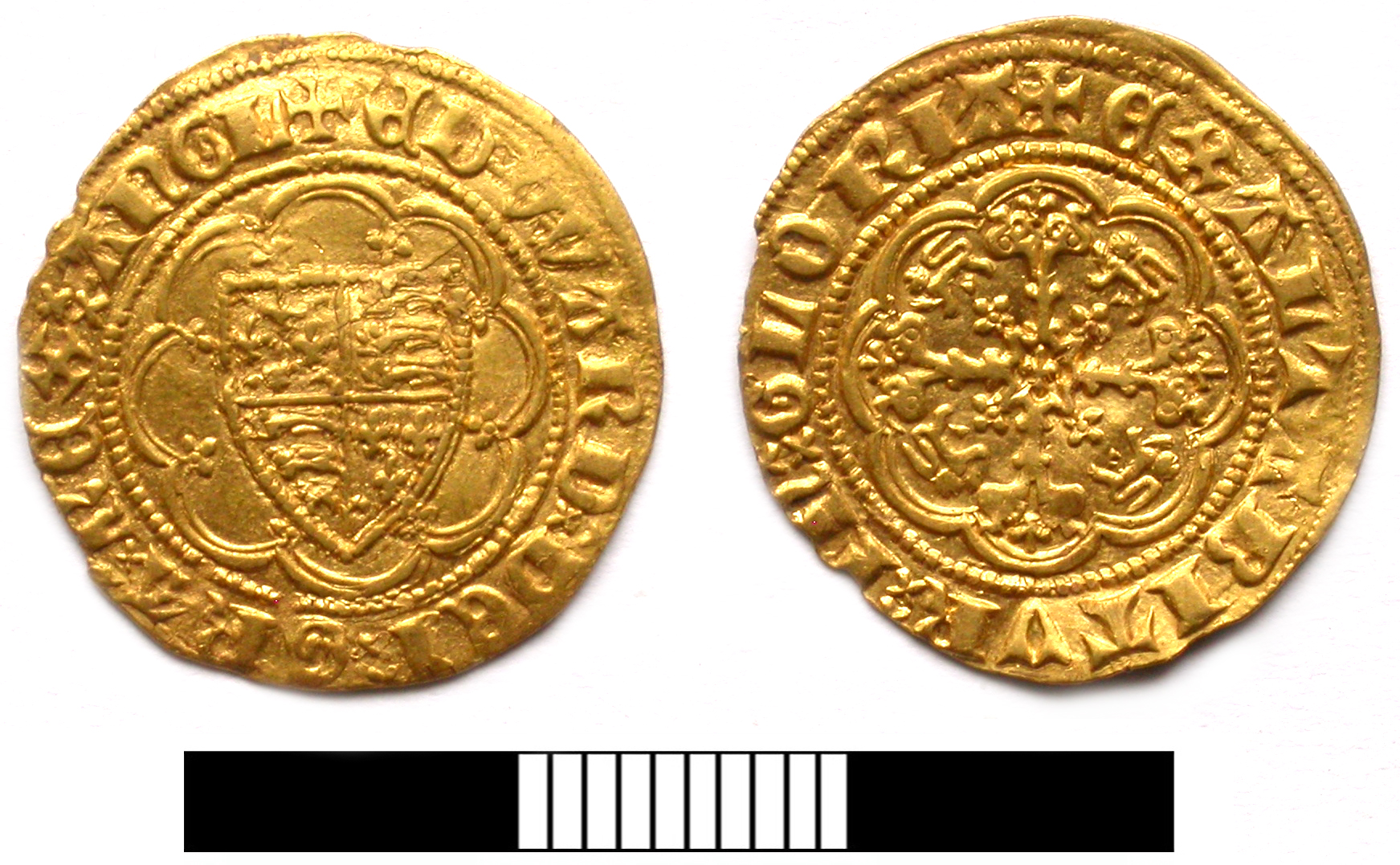
A gold quarter noble coin of Edward III, dating from c. 1363 – c. 1369, found in Horley in 2011

In 1602 it became the property of Christ's Hospital in London and the original map of the manor is now held at the Guildhall in the City of London. This shows that Horley consisted of three hamlets around a huge open common. One was around the area occupied by St Bartholomew's Church and the Six Bells public house; another by the River Mole and the third in Horley Row where some of Horley's oldest buildings can still be seen.

The Common was enclosed in 1816, new roads were laid and the intervening land was sold. In 1809 and later in 1816, two turnpikes were introduced to allow the operation of regular coach services from London to Brighton. The railway was laid in 1841 and a station was built in the town. From that position, and from that date, Horley grew at a slow rate until 1950. Since then its population has doubled as it became a dormitory town for London commuters.

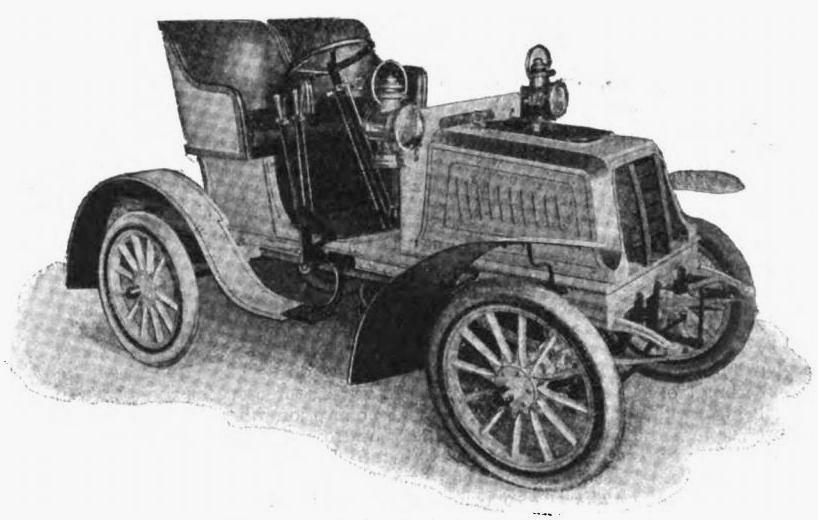
Horley 8 HP 2-seater (1904)

From 1904 until 1909 the Horley Motor & Engineering Co. manufactured cars and vans at their premises on Balcombe road. These were reportedly sold as Horley and No Name.

In 1908 the first scout patrol, the Pewit Patrol, was established. After gaining members this patrol formed the 1st Horley Scout Group. In 2006 1st Horley merged with 2nd Horley due to a lack of leaders. Notably Robert Baden-Powell was briefly a resident of Horley. When he left for Kenya in 1938 he gifted a Malayan basket and autographed photograph of himself to the Scouts Horley District.

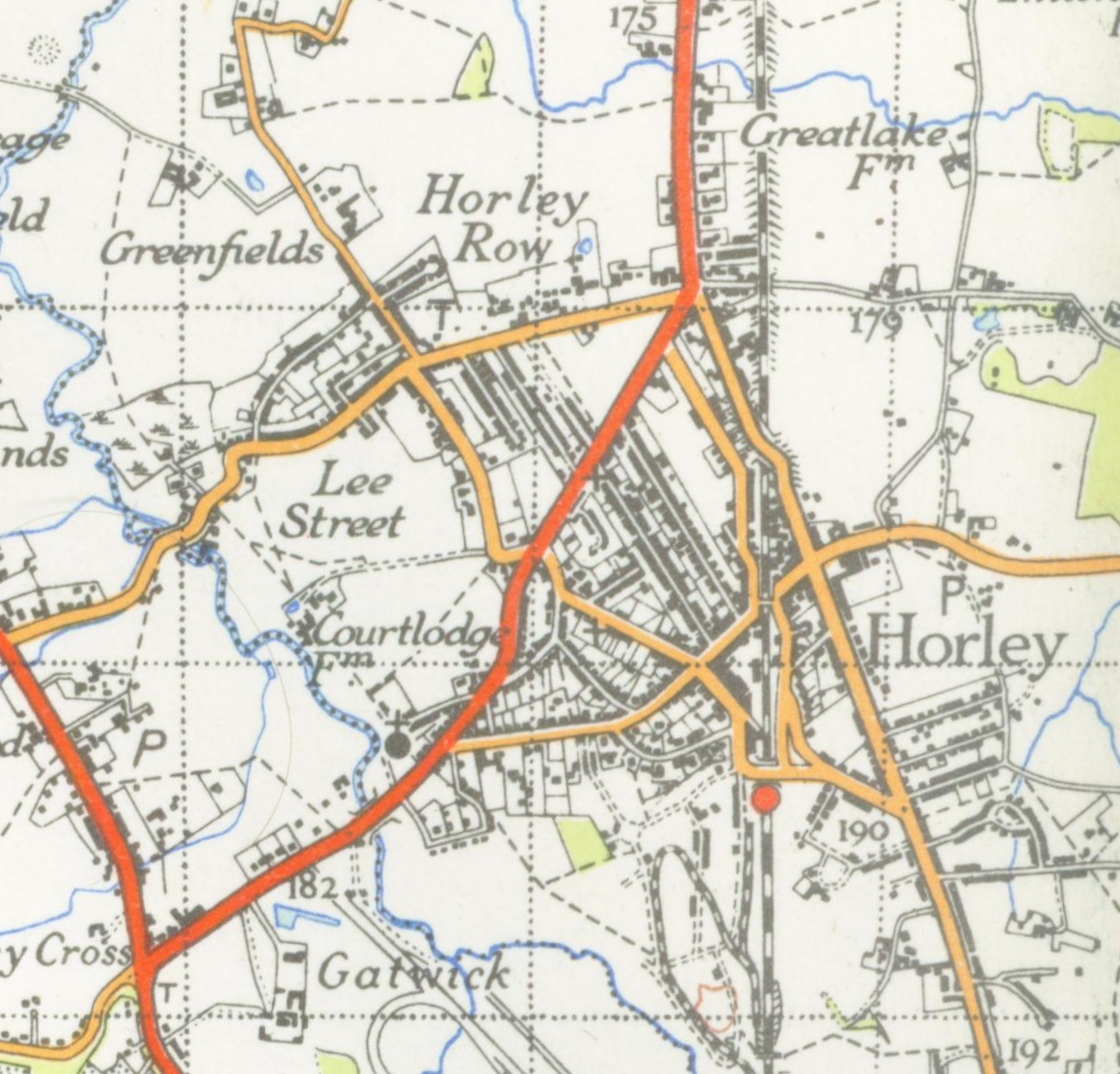
Map of Horley from 1946

The Local Government Act 1972 changed the boundary of Surrey and West Sussex and placed Horley, Gatwick and Charlwood in West Sussex. The removal of Gatwick Airport and the surrounding area from Surrey into West Sussex met some fierce local opposition with the result that the parishes of Horley and Charlwood were subsequently returned to Surrey in the eponymous Charlwood and Horley Act 1974, leaving the airport to stay in West Sussex.

The Horley Master Plan, approved by Reigate & Banstead Borough Council in February 2005, permits almost 2,600 new homes to be built. This prompted immediate controversy as the area as with most of non-metropolitan Surrey, i.e. since its reduction in 1974, is Metropolitan Green Belt however is permitted where in pursuance with the local plan, and meeting national criteria including demonstrating environmental sustainability and upholding the character of existing localities.

== Geography ==
Horley is at an altitude of around 54 m (177 ft) above mean sea level.

Salfords in the civil parish of Salfords and Sidlow, on the road to Redhill, is to the north and Gatwick Airport is between Horley and Crawley to the south. The village of Charlwood is to the west and Smallfield is to the east across the M23 Motorway.

== Politics ==
Horley is in the parliamentary constituency of Dorking and Horley.

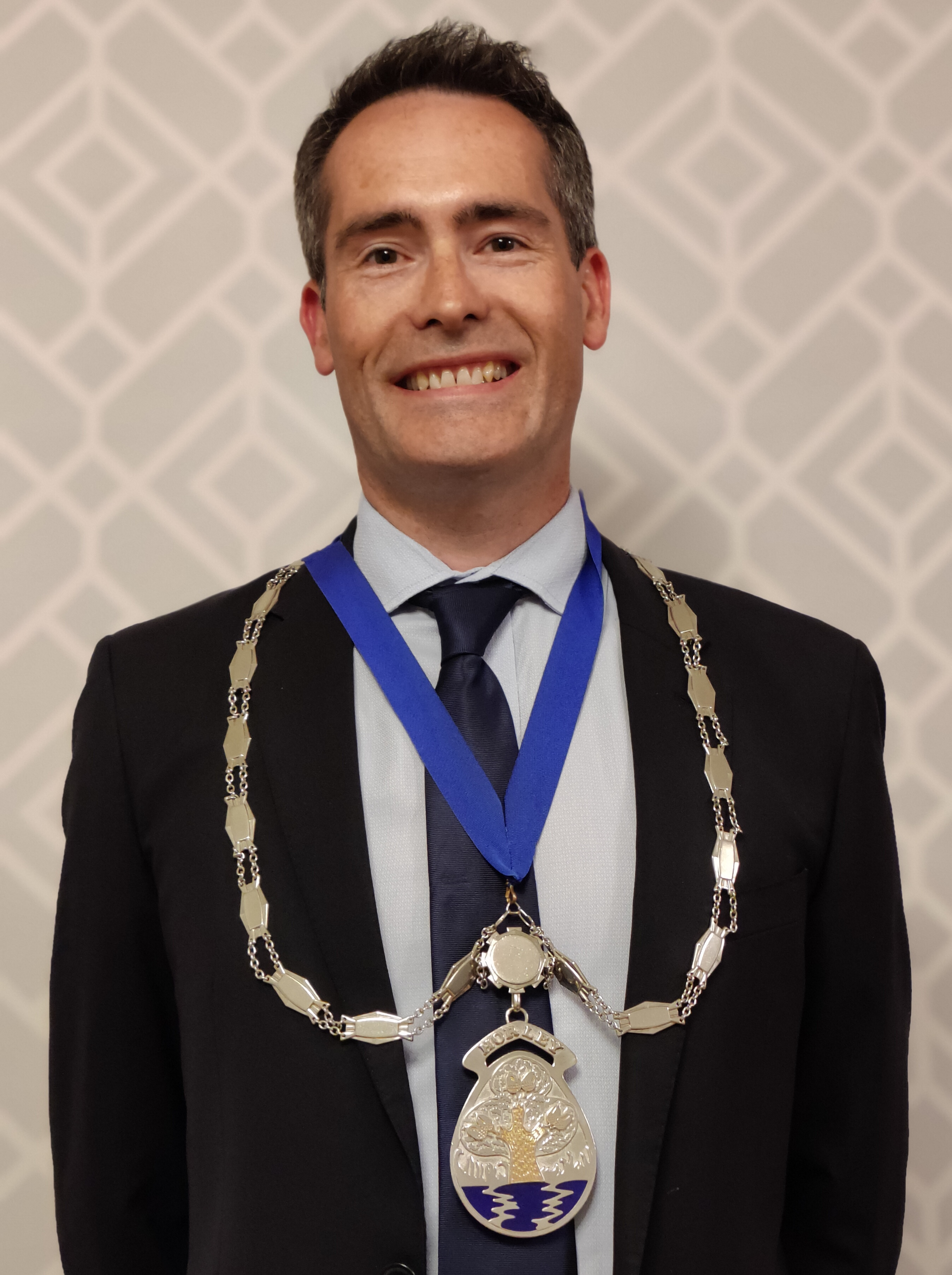
Martin Saunders - Mayor of Horley

Horley is part of the Borough of Reigate and Banstead, but also has a town council. The Town Mayor and Chairman of the Town Council for the years 2023 – 24 and 2024–25 is Residents' Association Independent Councillor Martin Saunders. In May 2016, the Conservative-led town council elected David Jackson as deputy mayor, even though he was at the time on bail and under investigation for sexually and indecently assaulting girls under the age of thirteen; he was subsequently convicted.

Horley has two representatives on Surrey County Council, headquartered in Reigate:

Election	Member	Ward
2021	Jordan Beech	Horley East
2021	Andy Lynch (Elected as Conservative)	Horley West, Salfords & Sidlow

Horley has 9 representatives on Reigate and Banstead Borough Council, headquartered in Reigate:

Election	Member	Ward
2019	Jerry Hudson	Horley Central & South
2019	Giorgio Buttironi	Horley Central & South
2022	Hannah Avery	Horley Central & South
2023	Jason Thorne	Horley East & Salfords
2024	Neha Boghani	Horley East & Salfords
2022	Victoria Chester	Horley East & Salfords
2018	Richard Biggs	Horley West & Sidlow
2024	Steve Wotton	Horley West & Sidlow
2021	James Baker	Horley West & Sidlow

Horley (along with Charlwood) was moved into West Sussex with Gatwick Airport by the Local Government Act 1972. Due to public opposition to these the changes, they were returned to Surrey in the Charlwood and Horley Act 1974, although the airport and Lowfield Heath stayed in West Sussex.

== Twinning ==
Horley has been twinned with the town of Vimy, France since 1991.

== Demography and housing ==
2011 Census Homes
Output area	Detached	Semi-detached	Terraced	Flats and apartments	Caravans/temporary/mobile homes	Shared between households
(Civil Parish)	2,463	3,111	1,456	2,011	8	8

The average level of accommodation in the region composed of detached houses was 28%, the average that was apartments was 22.6%.

2011 Census Key Statistics
Output area	Population	Households	% Owned outright	% Owned with a loan	Hectares
(Civil Parish)	22,076	9,057	31.7%	39.3%	1,124

The proportion of households in the civil parish who owned their home outright compares to the regional average of 35.1%. The proportion who owned their home with a loan compares to the regional average of 32.5%. The remaining % is made up of rented dwellings (plus a negligible % of households living rent-free).

There has been a substantial increase in housing and population since 2011, including the large new development at Westvale Park north west of the town centre.

== Economy ==
At one time the airline Dan-Air had its head office in the now demolished Newman House in Horley.

From 1947 until 1955, Horley was home to the Wade Engineering Ltd, who made Wade superchargers. Horley was also home to the Matbro works which produced forklift trucks from the 1950s to the 1980s and pioneered telescopic handlers. The bright yellow Teleram 40 and Teleram C machines were very popular with farmers and construction companies.

Horley is the present home of Scotia Gas Networks.

Today, about a third of the population work locally, while another third commute south to Gatwick and Crawley, and the final third travel further to London, Redhill and Reigate.

== Culture and the arts ==
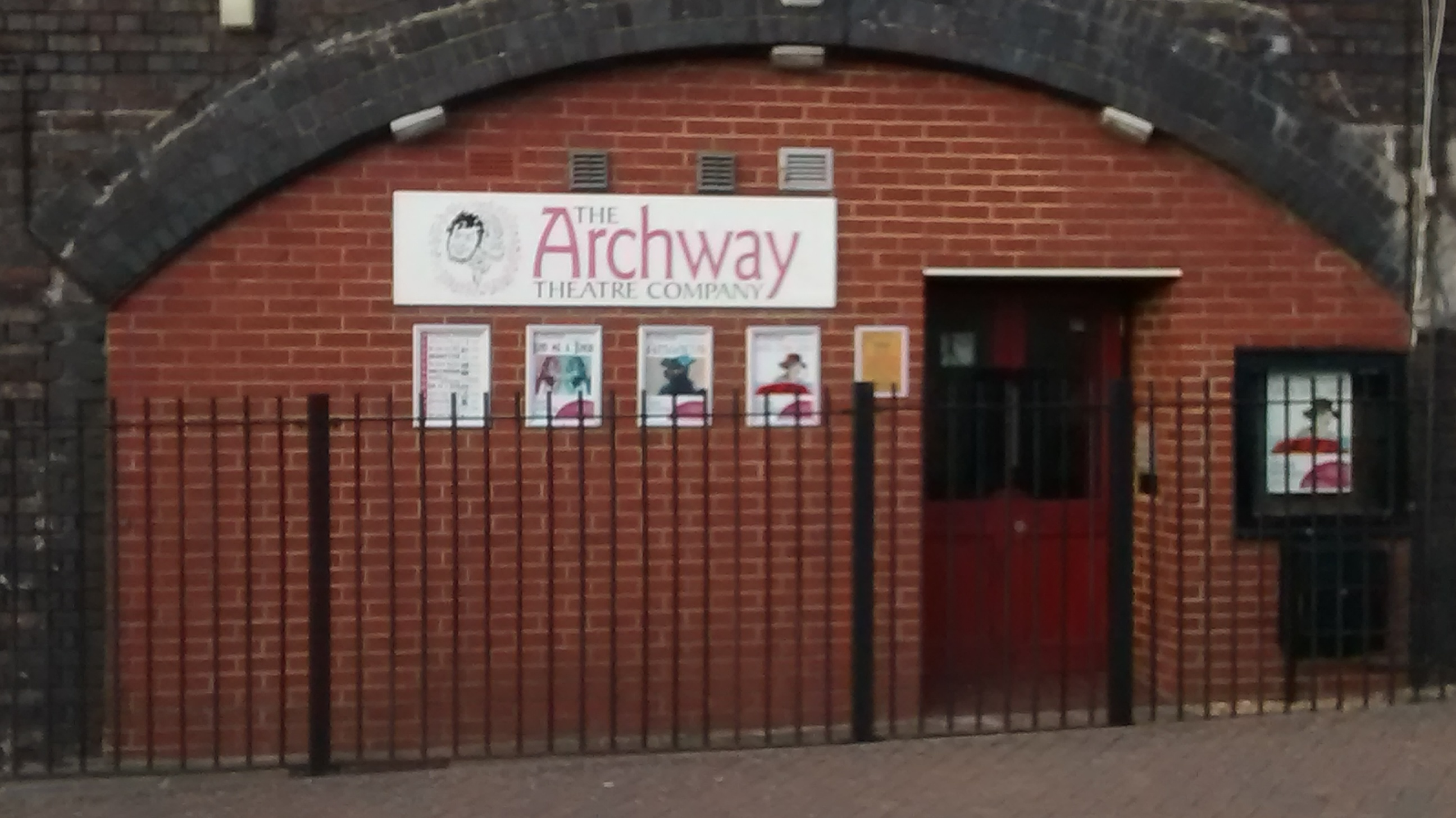
Entrance to the Archway Theatre, Horley, Surrey, UK.

Horley is home to the Archway Theatre under the arches of the Victoria Road railway bridge. It consists of a bar, auditorium, studio theatre and rehearsal rooms. The main auditorium seats 95 and the studio seats 40. The company presents 10 full productions each year as well as a number of studio events and youth productions.

== Transport ==
Horley is served by Metrobus bus routes connecting with Redhill, Three Bridges, Crawley, East Grinstead, Caterham and Gatwick Airport, as well as the outlying villages of Charlwood and Smallfield.

Horley railway station is served by Southern and Thameslink on the Brighton Main Line.

== Media ==
Horley is within the BBC London and ITV London region. Television signals are received from either the Reigate or Crystal Palace TV transmitters.

The local radio station is SUSY Radio, a community based station which broadcast on 103.4 FM.

The town is served by the local newspaper, Redhill, Reigate And Horley Life.

== Education ==
Horley has one secondary school (Oakwood School), three primary schools (Manorfield, Trinity Oaks and Langshott), two junior schools (Yattendon and Meath Green Junior), and two infant schools (Meath Green Infants and Horley Infants). There is currently no sixth form provision, so most students go to Redhill, Crawley or Reigate (e.g. East Surrey College and Reigate College) to continue their studies.

All the local schools are part of the Horley Learning Partnership, a local educational confederation which enables schools to develop a range of shared services. It also runs the Horley SureStart centre.

== Sports ==
Horley is the home town of Horley Town F.C. established in 1898. Horley has cricket, hockey, tennis, bowls, running and, since the first part of the 21st century, rugby union clubs.

== Notable people ==
- Robert Emms played Pythagoras in BBC1's mythic drama Atlantis in 2013. He was brought up in and went to school in the town.
- Jack Fairman was from Horley and has a pub named after him.
- Juliet Jacques writer and filmmaker, grew up and went to school in Horley.
- Dick Morrissey jazz musician and composer, born in Horley
- Robert Smith the founding member of The Cure lived in Horley as a child.
- Lol Tolhurst is a former member of The Cure who was born and lived in the town.
- Faye White the former captain of England Women's Football team was brought up in, and went to school in the town.
