= Revet =

Revet Реветь
- Village
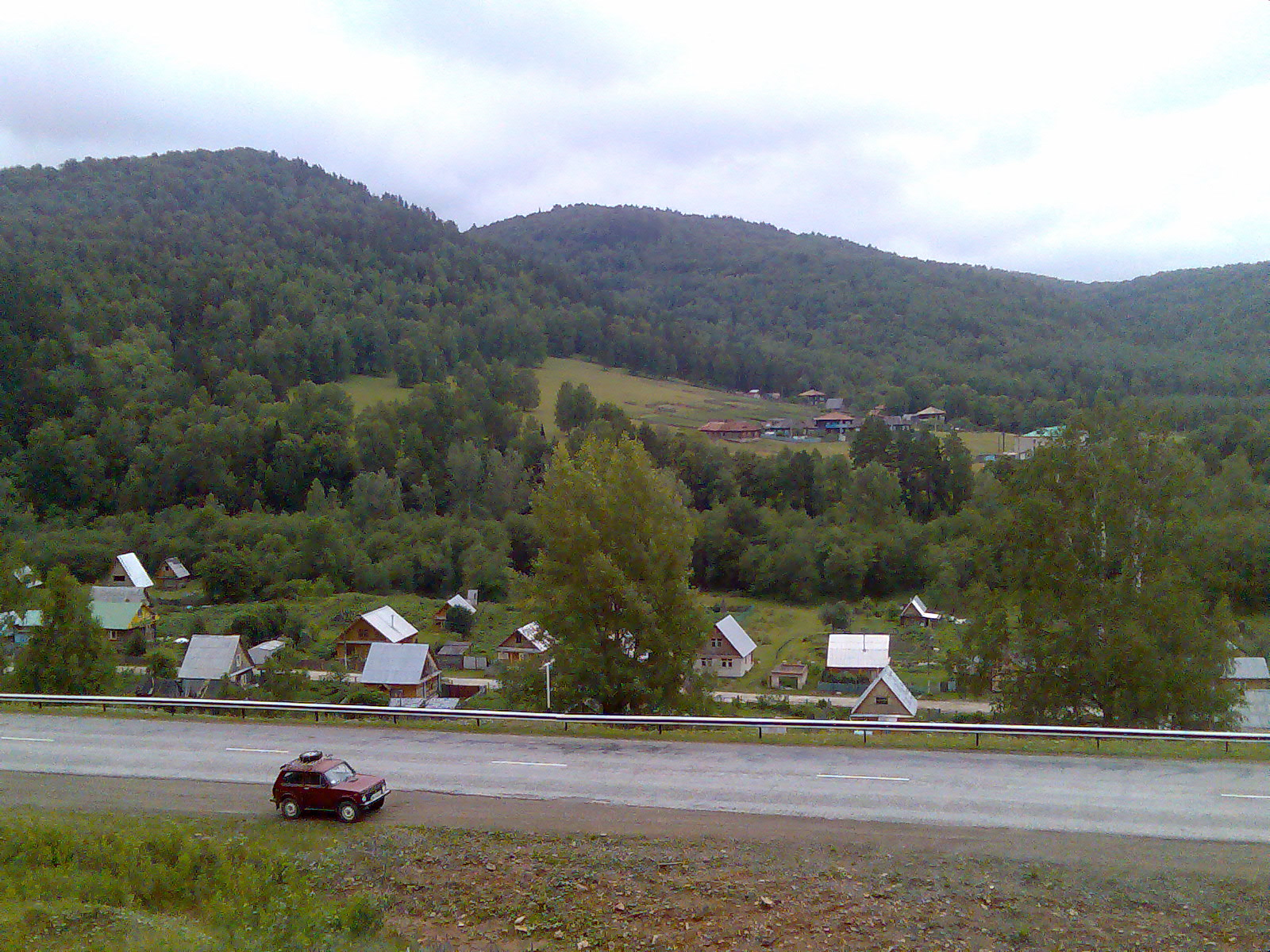

- Location within Bashkortostan Location within Russia
- Coordinates: 54°11′N 57°37′E
- Country: Russia
- Region: Bashkortostan
- District: Beloretsky District
- Time zone: UTC+5:00

Revet (Russian: Реветь; Bashkir: Рәүәт, Räwät) is a rural locality (a village) in Inzersky Selsoviet, Beloretsky District, Bashkortostan, Russia. The population was 61 as of 2010. There are 7 streets.

== Geography ==
Revet is located 85 km northwest of Beloretsk (the district's administrative centre) by road. Inzer is the nearest rural locality.
