= Joseph Soul =

Joseph Soul (1815–1881) was a nineteenth-century British reformer who worked for 36 years to assist the plight of orphaned children in London and in support of the abolition of slavery. He worked at the Orphan Working School in Hampstead and founded another orphanage at Holloway which together eventually became the Royal Alexandra and Albert School.

== Biography ==
Soul was born on 14 November 1815 and baptised in St Leonard's church in Shoreditch in February the following year. His parents were Eli and Elizabeth Soul.

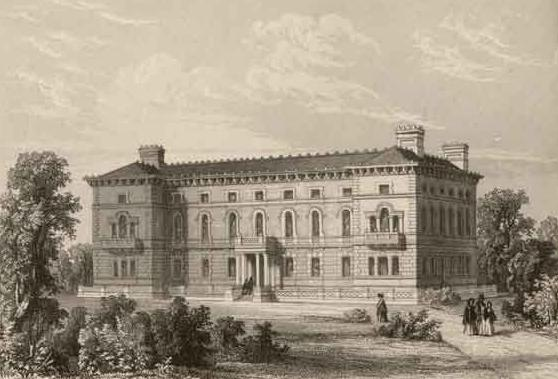
The Orphan school in the 19th century

He took up the position of secretary to the Orphan Working School in Hampstead. The school had been in existence since 1758.

In 1840 he attended the World's Anti-Slavery Convention in London where his portrait was included with other notables in a painting that is now in the National Portrait Gallery in London. Over the next few years Soul corresponding with the aging Thomas Clarkson keeping him informed on the progress of measures to abolish slavery completely.

The painting which shows Soul at the 1840 Anti-Slavery Convention. He is shown at the centre of the picture but right at the back

By 1859, the Orphan Working School was home to 250 children and since its inception it had acted in loco parentis for 1,889 children. The school relied entirely on public subscription but it was hoping to expand to take on additional children. The children learnt of the History and Geography of the Bible as well as studying scripture. Two of the orphans were those saved by the bravery of Alice Ayres. Alice had died saving these children and had been buried with public mourning due to her heroism. The school was able to teach these children so that they could become domestic servants.

Another orphanage was envisaged in 1864. The second school was intended for children between the age of five and eight and was founded by the Orphan Working School with Soul as the first honorary secretary. The establishment was based at Albert Hill in Holloway, London and was open to children independent of the religious denomination. In 1867 Queen Victoria planted a Wellingtonia Gigantea tree during an "Inauguration Ceremony" for the new school.

In 1870 the "Orphan Working School" was noted to include History, Geography, English and Maths. The Maths in the boys school was described as "excellent" although the girls school was not as good "as would be expected". The school was still working. The school in one year made over 1,000 items of clothing and repaired 17,000 other items. It made 130 frocks, trimmed 130 bonnets and repaired over 18,000 stockings.

In 1875, Soul was credited with leading the way for a convalescent home in Margate which was used by the children from the Hampstead school. The home was opened by Princess Mary and the Duke of Teck. The leading liberal politician, Earl Granville noted that "sadly" the children "inherited diseases from their parents."

Soul died in 1881 and the school went on to become the Royal Alexandra and Albert School.
