= Royal Alexandra and Albert School =

School in Surrey, England

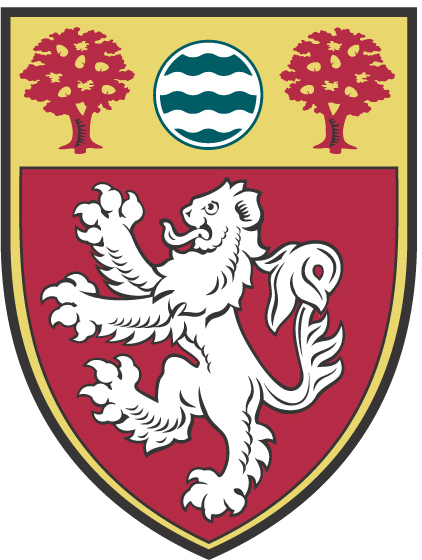
- School crest

Location
- Gatton Park; Reigate, Surrey, RH2 0TD; England
- 51.2617°N 0.1746°W

Information
- Type: Voluntary aided Day and boarding school
- Established: 1758; 268 years ago
- Founder: Kevin Birch
- Local authority: Surrey
- Department for Education URN: 125279 Tables
- Ofsted: Reports
- President: The Duchess of Gloucester
- Headteacher: Morgan Thomas
- Gender: Mixed
- Age: 7 to 18
- Enrolment: 1000
- Houses: Gatton Hall; Rank Weston; Elizabeth; Albert; Kent; Gloucester; Alexandra; Cornwall
- Former pupils: Old Gattonians
- Website: www.raa‑school.co.uk

Royal Alexandra and Albert School Act 1949
- Act of Parliament
- Parliament of the United Kingdom
- Long title: An Act to amalgamate the Royal Alexandra School and the Royal Albert School to make provision with respect to the property and funds of the said schools to incorporate the governing body of the amalgamated schools and define the objects and powers of the incorporated body and for other purposes.
- Citation: 12, 13 & 14 Geo. 6. c. xviii

Dates
- Royal assent: 14 July 1949

Text of statute as originally enacted

The Royal Alexandra and Albert School is an all-through co-educational boarding school near Reigate, Surrey. The headmaster as of 2022 is Morgan Thomas. The Royal Alexandra and Albert School Act 1949 (12, 13 & 14 Geo. 6. c. xviii) united The Royal Alexandra School, which was founded in 1758, and The Royal Albert Orphan School, which was founded in 1864 as a national memorial to Prince Albert, late husband of Queen Victoria. It is one of 27 state boarding schools in England and Wales, and the only one to educate children from primary school years to sixth form.

== History of the Royal Alexandra and Albert School ==
The earliest link in the school's history goes back to the Orphan Working School which was founded in 1758 by fourteen men meeting in an inn led by Edward Pickard, a dissenting minister. The school expanded under the secretaryship of Joseph Soul in Hampstead. It continued to expand and it opened a linked convalescent home in Margate.

The other part of the school was known as the Royal Albert Orphan Asylum. It opened in Camberley in 1864. The second school was intended for children between the ages of five and eight and was founded by the Orphan Working School, with Joseph Soul as the first honorary secretary. In 1867 Queen Victoria planted a Wellingtonia Gigantica tree during an "Inauguration Ceremony" for the school. A stone at the site was engraved VIR 1867 and is mistakenly thought by some to be the foundation stone of the building. The Wellingtonia survives to this day. A later patron of the school was Victoria's son Prince Arthur, Duke of Connaught and Strathearn.

After the school left, the site was for a while used as the WRAC College. Boys at the school were required to work in addition to their schooling: for example on the farm, in the gardens, in a tailor's shop and in a cobbler's workshop.

The two schools, the Royal Alexandra Orphanage and the Royal Albert School, joined together in Gatton Park, near Reigate, just after the Second World War. Over the years it evolved from an orphanage to a state boarding school. There are around 30 state boarding schools in the UK, where education is provided by the state and parents pay for board.

The school's foundation still supports some children whose home circumstances make a boarding education desirable, such as MOD Students.

== History of Gatton Park ==
The school's grounds, Gatton Park, were previously owned by Sir Jeremiah Colman of Colman's mustard, and were extensively landscaped by celebrated 18th century landscape gardener Capability Brown.

Gatton Hall, the stately home built within the grounds, is now used as a boarding house for Sixth Form students.

== Boarding at the Royal Alexandra and Albert School ==
There is school on Saturday mornings so that boarders can have longer holidays. Around half the pupils are full boarders who go home at weekends and for holidays. The rest are flexi-boarders who stay for an extended day and stay overnight for between 7 and 10 nights a year.

== Riding at the school ==
The School has its own riding stables and around 20 horses. Pupils can learn to ride for pleasure; lessons are arranged at lunchtimes or after school. The school is a member of the British Horse Society.

== Old Gattonians ==
Former pupils of school are known as Old Gattonians.
