= Reigate and Banstead Borough Council elections =

Local government elections in Surrey, England

Map of Reigate and Banstead borough, showing the political composition of the council after the 2024 Election. Conservatives in blue, Greens in green, Residents Associations in grey, Liberal Democrats in yellow, Labour in red and independents in light grey.

One third of Reigate and Banstead Borough Council in Surrey, England was elected each year, followed by one year without election. Since the boundary changes in 2019, 45 councillors have been elected from 15 wards. The council is due to be abolished on 1 April 2027 following structural changes to local government in Surrey.

== Election results ==
Composition of the council
| Year | Conservative | Labour | Liberal Democrats (Note: Includes totals for the predecessors of the Liberal Democrats, the Liberal Party and SDP (both of which participated in the Alliance).) | Green (Note: Includes totals for the predecessors of the Green Party of England and Wales, the Ecology Party and Green Party UK.) | Independents & Others | Council control after election |
|---|---|---|---|---|---|---|
Local government reorganisation; council established (50 seats)
| 1973 | 31 | 15 | 4 | – | 0 | Conservative |
New ward boundaries (60 seats)
| 1976 | 45 | 13 | 2 | 0 | 0 | Conservative |
New ward boundaries (49 seats)
| 1979 | 37 | 11 | 0 | 0 | 1 | Conservative |
| 1980 | 37 | 12 | 0 | 0 | 0 | Conservative |
| 1982 | 38 | 11 | 0 | 0 | 0 | Conservative |
| 1983 | 38 | 11 | 0 | 0 | 0 | Conservative |
| 1984 | 38 | 10 | 1 | 0 | 0 | Conservative |
| 1986 | 33 | 10 | 5 | 0 | 1 | Conservative |
| 1987 | 32 | 10 | 6 | 0 | 1 | Conservative |
| 1988 | 32 | 10 | 3 | 0 | 4 | Conservative |
| 1990 | 27 | 11 | 6 | 0 | 5 | Conservative |
| 1991 | 24 | 12 | 8 | 0 | 5 | No overall control |
| 1992 | 24 | 11 | 10 | 0 | 4 | No overall control |
| 1994 | 22 | 11 | 12 | 0 | 4 | No overall control |
| 1995 | 18 | 12 | 14 | 0 | 5 | No overall control |
| 1996 | 15 | 14 | 14 | 0 | 6 | No overall control |
| 1998 | 19 | 13 | 11 | 0 | 6 | No overall control |
| 1999 | 22 | 13 | 8 | 0 | 6 | No overall control |
New ward boundaries (51 seats)
| 2000 | 33 | 8 | 4 | 0 | 6 | Conservative |
| 2002 | 33 | 6 | 6 | 0 | 6 | Conservative |
| 2003 | 33 | 5 | 7 | 0 | 6 | Conservative |
| 2004 | 37 | 3 | 5 | 0 | 6 | Conservative |
| 2006 | 39 | 2 | 4 | 0 | 6 | Conservative |
| 2007 | 42 | 1 | 2 | 0 | 6 | Conservative |
| 2008 | 39 | 1 | 3 | 0 | 8 | Conservative |
| 2010 | 39 | 1 | 3 | 1 | 7 | Conservative |
| 2011 | 38 | 0 | 3 | 2 | 8 | Conservative |
| 2012 | 37 | 0 | 2 | 3 | 9 | Conservative |
| 2014 | 37 | 0 | 2 | 3 | 9 (Note: Including 1 UKIP) | Conservative |
| 2015 | 40 | 0 | 1 | 2 | 8 | Conservative |
| 2016 | 39 | 0 | 2 | 2 | 8 | Conservative |
| 2018 | 40 | 0 | 1 | 3 | 7 | Conservative |
New ward boundaries (45 seats)
| 2019 | 29 | 0 | 3 | 6 | 7 (Note: 6 Residents, 1 Independent) | Conservative |
| 2021 | 28 | 0 | 3 | 7 | 6 | Conservative |
| 2022 | 27 | 0 | 3 | 9 | 6 | Conservative |
| 2023 | 23 | 1 | 3 | 11 | 7 | Conservative |
| 2024 | 18 | 2 | 4 | 13 | 8 (Note: 6 Residents, 2 Independents) | No overall control |

== Results maps ==
2002 results map

2003 results map

2004 results map

2006 results map

2007 results map

2008 results map

2010 results map

2011 results map

2012 results map

2014 results map

2015 results map

2016 results map

2018 results map

2019 results map

2021 results map

2022 results map

2023 results map

2024 results map

== By-election results ==
=== 2002-2006 ===
Tattenhams By-Election 5 May 2005
| Party | Candidate | Votes | % | ±% |
|---|---|---|---|---|
| Tattenhams RA | Jill Bray | 1,973 | 58.0 | −2.6 |
| Conservative | | 998 | 29.3 | +3.5 |
| Labour | | 433 | 12.7 | +6.7 |
| Majority | | 975 | 28.6 | |
| Turnout | | 3,404 | | |
| Tattenhams RA hold | | Swing | | |

=== 2006-2010 ===
Earlswood and Whitebushes By-Election 13 December 2007
| Party | Candidate | Votes | % | ±% |
|---|---|---|---|---|
| Conservative | Jane Thomson | 421 | 37.6 | −3.9 |
| Liberal Democrats | Steve Oddy | 380 | 33.9 | +4.9 |
| Labour | Stuart Gosling | 152 | 13.6 | −1.9 |
| UKIP | Joseph Fox | 113 | 10.1 | +1.8 |
| Green | Joseph Barnes | 54 | 4.8 | −0.9 |
| Majority | | 41 | 3.7 | |
| Turnout | | 1,120 | 17.7 | |
| Conservative hold | | Swing | | |

Tadworth and Walton By-Election 30 April 2009
| Party | Candidate | Votes | % | ±% |
|---|---|---|---|---|
| Conservative | Richard Bennett | 925 | 64.3 | −7.1 |
| UKIP | Joseph Fox | 350 | 24.3 | +15.3 |
| Labour | David Knowles | 163 | 11.3 | +5.0 |
| Majority | | 575 | 40.0 | |
| Turnout | | 1,438 | 26.9 | |
| Conservative hold | | Swing | | |

Earlswood and Whitebushes By-Election 17 December 2009
| Party | Candidate | Votes | % | ±% |
|---|---|---|---|---|
| Conservative | Gill Emmerton | 391 | 37.9 | −12.8 |
| Liberal Democrats | Steve Eddy | 313 | 30.4 | +6.6 |
| Labour | Rosie Norgrove | 161 | 15.6 | −0.7 |
| UKIP | Joseph Fox | 125 | 12.1 | +2.8 |
| BNP | Peter Phillips | 41 | 4.0 | +4.0 |
| Majority | | 78 | 7.5 | |
| Turnout | | 1,031 | 16.4 | |
| Conservative hold | | Swing | | |

=== 2010-2014 ===
South Park and Woodhatch By-Election 2 May 2013
| Party | Candidate | Votes | % | ±% |
|---|---|---|---|---|
| Conservative | Simon Rickman | 546 | 33.0 | −14.7 |
| UKIP | Joseph Fox | 518 | 31.3 | +31.3 |
| Labour | Helen Young | 327 | 19.8 | −11.8 |
| Green | Lynne Burnham | 149 | 9.0 | +9.0 |
| Liberal Democrats | Anthony Lambell | 115 | 6.9 | −13.8 |
| Majority | | 28 | 1.7 | |
| Turnout | | 1,655 | | |
| Conservative hold | | Swing | | |

=== 2014-2018 ===
Kingswood with Burgh Heath By-Election 3 November 2016
| Party | Candidate | Votes | % | ±% |
|---|---|---|---|---|
| Conservative | Rod Ashford | 839 | 73.3 | +6.6 |
| UKIP | Gerard Hever | 155 | 13.5 | −8.1 |
| Labour | Tony Robinson | 96 | 8.4 | −3.2 |
| Green | Shasha Khan | 55 | 4.8 | +4.8 |
| Majority | | 684 | 59.7 | |
| Turnout | | 1,145 | | |
| Conservative hold | | Swing | | |

Tadworth and Walton By-Election 4 May 2017
| Party | Candidate | Votes | % | ±% |
|---|---|---|---|---|
| Conservative | George Curry | 1,590 | 74.6 | +24.5 |
| Independent | Margaret Walkling | 394 | 18.5 | −3.4 |
| UKIP | Valerie Moore | 148 | 6.9 | −6.3 |
| Majority | | 1,196 | 56.1 | |
| Turnout | | 2,132 | | |
| Conservative hold | | Swing | | |

=== 2022-2027 ===
Meadvale and St John's By-Election 16 October 2025
| Party | Candidate | Votes | % | ±% |
|---|---|---|---|---|
| Liberal Democrats | Mark Johnston | 1,009 | 48.3 | +11.7 |
| Green | Natasha Lawrence | 368 | 17.6 | −0.6 |
| Conservative | Will de Save | 251 | 12.0 | −16.9 |
| Reform | Marcus Harriott | 242 | 11.6 | +11.6 |
| Independent | Jonathan White | 218 | 10.4 | +10.4 |
| Majority | | 641 | 30.7 | |
| Turnout | | 2,088 | | |
| Liberal Democrats hold | | Swing | | |

Earlswood and Whitebushes By-Election 7 May 2026
| Party | Candidate | Votes | % | ±% |
|---|---|---|---|---|
| Green | Robin Whitwell | 1,587 | 48.3 | −12.1 |
| Reform | Joseph Fox | 715 | 21.8 | +21.8 |
| Conservative | Brian O'Neill | 514 | 15.6 | −2.0 |
| Liberal Democrats | Chris Kelly | 246 | 7.5 | +0.1 |
| Labour | Elliott Wragg | 223 | 6.8 | −7.8 |
| Majority | | 872 | 26.5 | |
| Turnout | | 3,285 | | |
| Green hold | | Swing | | |

Hooley, Merstham and Netherne By-Election 6 August 2026
| Party | Candidate | Votes | % | ±% |
|---|---|---|---|---|
| Green | Nick Abear | 934 | 41.8 | +3.4 |
| Reform | Johnny Wolf | 545 | 24.4 | +13.6 |
| Conservative | Jon Mears | 454 | 20.3 | −3.8 |
| Liberal Democrats | Tina Cohen | 166 | 7.4 | +0.8 |
| Labour | Catherine Barrett | 138 | 6.2 | −14.0 |
| Majority | | 389 | 17.4 | |
| Turnout | | 2,237 | | |
| Green gain from Conservative | | Swing | | |
