= 2019 Reigate and Banstead Borough Council election =

2019 UK local government election

Results of the 2019 Reigate and Banstead Borough Council election

The 2019 Reigate and Banstead Borough Council election took place on 2 May 2019 to elect members to Reigate and Banstead Borough Council in England. It coincided with other local elections. Due to ward boundary changes, the entire council was up for election for the seats in the all new wards. Each ward is a three member ward. These were the first boundary changes since 2000.

== Results summary ==
2019 Reigate and Banstead Borough Council election
Party	Seats	Gains	Losses	Net gain/loss	Seats %	Votes %	Votes	+/−
Conservative	29	–	–	▼13		41.9	37,752	
Green	6	–	–	▲3		15.6	14,017	
Liberal Democrats	3	–	–	▲2		13.9	12,558	
Nork RA	3	–	–	Steady		5.6	5,014	
Tattenham RA	3	–	–	Steady		4.5	4,090	
Independent	1	–	–	Steady		1.2	1,096	
Labour	0	–	–	Steady		13.0	11,702	
UKIP	0	–	–	Steady		4.3	3,830	

== Ward results ==
=== Banstead Village ===
Banstead Village
Party	Candidate	Votes	%	±%
Conservative	Eddy Humphreys	1,233	60.3	
Conservative	Sam Walsh	1,210	59.1	
Conservative	Nadean Moses	1,076	52.6	
Green	Sophie Rowlands	674	32.9	
UKIP	Laurence Clack	380	18.6	
Labour	Barbara Williams	375	18.3	
Turnout		2,046	30.0	
Conservative win (new seat)				
Conservative win (new seat)				
Conservative win (new seat)				

=== Chipstead, Kingswood and Woodmansterne ===
Chipstead, Kingswood and Woodmansterne
Party	Candidate	Votes	%	±%
Conservative	Tim Archer	1,422	61.6	
Conservative	Simon Parnall	1,277	55.4	
Conservative	Caroline Neame	1,207	52.3	
Green	Sasha Khan	642	27.8	
Liberal Democrats	Eileen Hannah	545	23.6	
UKIP	Gerry Hever	367	15.9	
Labour	Ian Thirlwall	357	15.5	
Turnout		2,307	30.8	
Conservative win (new seat)				
Conservative win (new seat)				
Conservative win (new seat)				

=== Earlswood and Whitebushes ===
Earlswood and Whitebushes
Party	Candidate	Votes	%	±%
Green	Hal Brown	1,452	58.2	
Green	Ruth Ritter	1,194	47.8	
Green	Susan Fenton	1,119	44.8	
Conservative	Barbara Thomson	574	23.0	
Conservative	Chris Reynolds	573	23.0	
Conservative	Shysta Manzoor	496	19.9	
UKIP	Joe Fox	291	11.7	
Labour	James Sunderland	291	11.7	
Labour	Rex Giles	255	10.2	
Liberal Democrats	Anthony Anderson	252	10.1	
Labour	Jody Salisbury	235	9.4	
Liberal Democrats	Jane Kulka	229	9.2	
Turnout		2,496	35.1	
Green win (new seat)				
Green win (new seat)				
Green win (new seat)				

=== Hooley, Merstham and Netherne ===
Hooley, Merstham and Netherne
Party	Candidate	Votes	%	±%
Conservative	Mark Brunt	1,026	43.1	
Conservative	Keith Forman	776	32.6	
Conservative	Frank Kelly	722	30.3	
Labour	Shaka Aklilu	664	27.9	
Labour	Leon Bourne	598	25.1	
Green	Chantal Clarke	586	24.6	
Labour	Stewart Dack	510	21.4	
Liberal Democrats	Jemma de Vincenzo	435	18.3	
Liberal Democrats	Graham Burr	406	17.0	
Liberal Democrats	Toby Risk	344	14.4	
UKIP	Steve Richards	330	13.8	
Turnout		2,383	30.5	
Conservative win (new seat)				
Conservative win (new seat)				
Conservative win (new seat)				

=== Horley Central and South ===
Horley Central and South
Party	Candidate	Votes	%	±%
Conservative	Jerry Hudson	825	40.7	
Conservative	Andy Lynch	822	40.6	
Conservative	Christian Stevens	782	38.6	
Green	Katherine Liakos	592	29.2	
Labour	Rob Spencer	580	28.6	
UKIP	Christopher Dunbar	535	26.4	
Labour	Tom Turner	529	26.1	
Labour	Linda Mabbett	495	24.4	
Turnout		2,027	27.2	
Conservative win (new seat)				
Conservative win (new seat)				
Conservative win (new seat)				

=== Horley East and Salfords ===
Horley East and Salfords
Party	Candidate	Votes	%	±%
Conservative	Tony Schofield	993	46.1	
Conservative	Derek Allcard	912	42.4	
Conservative	Graham Knight	881	40.9	
Green	Simon Pinto	819	38.1	
Labour	Barry Cullen	560	26.0	
Labour	Toby Brampton	502	23.3	
UKIP	Dneis Berarie	440	20.4	
Turnout		2,152	29.9	
Conservative win (new seat)				
Conservative win (new seat)				
Conservative win (new seat)				

=== Horley West and Sidlow ===
Horley West and Sidlow
Party	Candidate	Votes	%	±%
Conservative	Richard Biggs	926	49.2	
Conservative	Alex Horwood	759	40.4	
Conservative	Giorgio Buttironi	687	36.5	
Liberal Democrats	Geoffrey Southall	619	32.9	
UKIP	Peter Palmer	511	27.2	
Labour	Sara-Jane Hepburn	505	26.8	
Labour	Rick Starczweski	415	22.1	
Turnout		1,881	27.8	
Conservative win (new seat)				
Conservative win (new seat)				
Conservative win (new seat)				

=== Lower Kingswood, Tadworth and Walton ===
Lower Kingswood, Tadworth and Walton
Party	Candidate	Votes	%	±%
Conservative	Rachel Turner	1,559	62.2	
Conservative	Rod Ashford	1,527	60.9	
Conservative	Jamie Paul	1,509	60.2	
Liberal Democrats	Christopher Howell	595	23.7	
UKIP	Valerie Moore	481	19.2	
Labour	David Burnley	327	13.0	
Turnout		2,506	32.1	
Conservative win (new seat)				
Conservative win (new seat)				
Conservative win (new seat)				

=== Meadvale and St. John's ===
Meadvale and St. John's
Party	Candidate	Votes	%	±%
Liberal Democrats	Stephen Kulka	1,333	49.0	
Liberal Democrats	Jane Philpott	1,248	45.9	
Liberal Democrats	David Ross	1,022	37.6	
Conservative	Jonathan White	928	34.1	
Conservative	Lindy Murray	869	31.9	
Conservative	Tim Peniston-Bird	825	30.3	
Green	Soo Abram	705	25.9	
Labour	Rosie Norgrove	245	9.0	
Labour	John Adams	243	8.9	
Labour	Gerry O'Dwyer	158	5.8	
Turnout		2,720	41.1	
Liberal Democrats win (new seat)				
Liberal Democrats win (new seat)				
Liberal Democrats win (new seat)				

=== Nork ===
Nork
Party	Candidate	Votes	%	±%
Nork RA	Gemma Adamson	1,759	77.4	
Nork RA	Ross Feeney	1,650	72.6	
Nork RA	Peter Harp	1,605	70.6	
Conservative	Chloe Schendel-Wilson	424	18.7	
Conservative	Jim Couchman	356	15.7	
Conservative	Tony Rigby	322	14.2	
Liberal Democrats	Stephen Gee	187	8.2	
Labour	Emma Smith	145	6.4	
Turnout		2,273	31.7	
Nork RA win (new seat)				
Nork RA win (new seat)				
Nork RA win (new seat)				

=== Redhill East ===
Redhill East
Party	Candidate	Votes	%	±%
Green	Jonathan Essex	1,373	67.1	
Green	Stephen McKenna	1,187	58.0	
Green	Sue Sinden	1,099	53.7	
Conservative	Richard Coad	434	21.2	
Conservative	Paul Bevan	371	18.1	
Conservative	Abhishek Sachdeva	252	12.3	
Labour	John Berge	179	8.7	
Liberal Democrats	Stuart Holmes	167	8.2	
Labour	Ann Watkins	152	7.4	
Liberal Democrats	Gemma Roulston	151	7.4	
UKIP	Alastair Richardson	150	7.3	
Liberal Democrats	Andrew Cressy	149	7.3	
Labour	Tony Robinson	117	5.7	
Turnout		2,047	34.1	
Green win (new seat)				
Green win (new seat)				
Green win (new seat)				

=== Redhill West and Wray Common ===
Redhill West and Wray Common
Party	Candidate	Votes	%	±%
Conservative	Natalie Bramhall	1,005	42.9	
Conservative	Rich Michalowski	905	38.6	
Conservative	Kanika Sachdeva	829	35.4	
Green	Joseph Booton	636	27.1	
Green	Kumari Lane	591	25.2	
Green	Frank Percy	538	23.0	
Liberal Democrats	Susan Vincent	424	18.1	
Liberal Democrats	Michael Rogers	419	17.9	
Labour	Yvonne England	406	17.3	
Liberal Democrats	David Sayers	377	16.1	
Labour	Jon Pepper	349	14.9	
Labour	Douglas Wickenden	286	12.2	
Turnout		2,344	32.4	
Conservative win (new seat)				
Conservative win (new seat)				
Conservative win (new seat)				

=== Reigate ===
Reigate
Party	Candidate	Votes	%	±%
Conservative	Rosemary Absalom	1,297	43.0	
Independent	Christopher Whinney	1,096	36.4	
Conservative	Michael Blacker	1,063	35.3	
Conservative	Rita Renton	1,037	34.4	
Liberal Democrats	John Vincent	856	28.4	
Liberal Democrats	Gregory Ardan	783	26.0	
Liberal Democrats	Monica Dyer	771	25.6	
Green	Leon Deith	612	20.3	
Labour	Janine Baker	197	6.5	
Labour	Peter Grove	192	6.4	
Labour	Graham Wildridge	146	4.8	
Turnout		3,015	41.6	
Conservative win (new seat)				
Independent win (new seat)				
Conservative win (new seat)				

=== South Park and Woodhatch ===
South Park and Woodhatch
Party	Candidate	Votes	%	±%
Conservative	James King	865	39.4	
Conservative	Victor Lewanski	759	34.6	
Conservative	Simon Rickman	687	31.3	
Green	Lynne Burnham	654	29.8	
Labour	Susan Gregory	517	23.6	
Liberal Democrats	Moray Carey	457	20.8	
Labour	Bob Griffiths	431	19.6	
Liberal Democrats	Helen Samuel	422	19.2	
Labour	Mick Hay	377	17.2	
Liberal Democrats	Joanna Lloyd	367	16.7	
UKIP	Chris Byrne	345	15.7	
Turnout		2,194	34.1	
Conservative win (new seat)				
Conservative win (new seat)				
Conservative win (new seat)				

=== Tattenham Corner and Preston ===
Tattenham Corner and Preston
Party	Candidate	Votes	%	±%
Tattenhams RA	Jill Bray	1,397	74.3	
Tattenhams RA	Nick Harrison	1,363	72.5	
Tattenhams RA	Non Harper	1,330	70.7	
Conservative	Frances Clarke	263	14.0	
Conservative	Aaron Harris	249	13.2	
Conservative	Rahul Batra	238	12.7	
Labour	Jake Bonner	211	11.2	
Green	Alistair Morten	198	10.5	
Labour	John Cordner	153	8.1	
Turnout		1,881	26.8	
Tattenhams RA win (new seat)				
Tattenhams RA win (new seat)				
Tattenhams RA win (new seat)				
