= 2010 Reigate and Banstead Borough Council election =

2010 English local government election

Map of the 2010 Reigate and Banstead Borough Council election

The 2010 Reigate and Banstead Borough Council election took place on 6 May 2010 to elect a third of the members of Reigate and Banstead Borough Council, the borough of Reigate and Banstead in England. This was on the same day as the other local elections across England as well as the 2010 United Kingdom general election. The previous council election took place in 2008 and the following election was held in 2011. In the election, the council stayed under Conservative control. Following the election, the council appointed a new chief executive. In 2013, a UK Independence Party candidate appeared in court charged with standing for election while disqualified.

== Results ==
Party	Previous	Seats +/-	2008
Conservative	39	Steady	39
Residents Association	6	Steady	6
Liberal Democrat	3	Steady	3
Labour	1	Steady	1
Others	2	▲2	2

== See also ==
- Reigate and Banstead Borough Council elections
