= Honeycrock Farm =

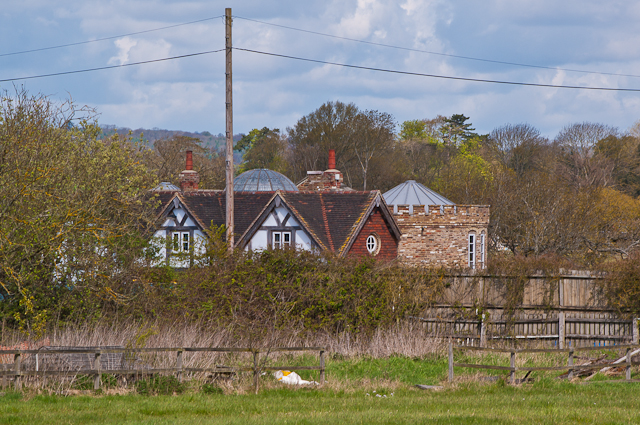
- The disputed dwelling at Honeycrock Farm, April 2012

- Location within Surrey

General information
- Status: Demolished
- Type: House
- Architectural style: Mock Tudor
- Location: Honeycrock Farm, Axes Lane, Salfords, Surrey, United Kingdom
- Coordinates: 51°12′16″N 0°9′00″W
- Topped-out: c.2001
- Completed: c.2001
- Demolished: 2016
- Owner: Robert Fidler

Technical details
- Floor count: Two

Design and construction
- Known for: Being built without planning permission

Other information
- Number of rooms: Four bedrooms

Honeycrock Farm in Salfords, Surrey was the subject of a lengthy legal battle to demolish a Mock Tudor family home that was built without planning permission. The action was taken by Reigate and Banstead Borough Council after the site's owner built a large dwelling (c.2001) concealed behind a haystack. The local authority only became aware of the mock castle after the bales were removed in 2004. Known popularly after its owner as "Fidler's Castle", the building was eventually demolished in 2016 following a decade of legal disputes.

== Background ==
In or around 2001, Robert Fidler, the owner of Honeycrock Farm, decided to build a two-storey mock Tudor castle on his property without the necessary planning permission for the construction of a dwelling. Although a planning application had been lodged with Reigate and Banstead Borough Council for the conversion of a cowshed to residential use, Fidler claimed the council had two months to respond to the application but had failed to do so. He hid the house under a large haystack for four years erroneously believing that if the building managed to stand for that period of time without objection it would legally be allowed to remain.

== Planning dispute ==
In August 2006, the council had become aware of the building because Fidler had by now removed the hay bales. By January 2008, Fidler was resisting an order by the local authority to demolish it. In the same year, his ruse to conceal his home came to national attention when it was broadcast in an edition of New Homes From Hell on ITV1.

In 2010, the UK's Appeal Court ruled that because the building had been deliberately concealed, the four-year period only began once the building had been revealed, making the council's objections well within the legal time limit. Fidler was again ordered to demolish the building.

In February 2014, Fidler tried to get a retrospective planning application for the property but the application was refused in April. In June, the council obtained an injunction ordering Fidler to comply with enforcement notices to demolish the building.

In April 2015, Fidler accepted that the building had to be demolished. But after he ignored a High Court order to demolish the house by 24 June 2015, the council lodged a claim of contempt of court against Fidler in August. The Surrey farmer was subsequently found to be in contempt of court and given a three-month suspended prison sentence and again ordered to demolish the building, this time by 6 June 2016. Three days before this deadline, it was reported that the building had been largely demolished. The council stated that it had applied for a one-month court extension to allow Fidler to complete the removal of the building's patio and garden.
