= 2023 Reigate and Banstead Borough Council election =

2023 Reigate and Banstead Borough Council
← 2022	4 May 2023	2024 →

15 out of 45 seats to Reigate and Banstead Borough Council 23 seats needed for a majority
- Turnout: 33.2%

	First party	Second party	Third party
Leader	Mark Brunt	Jonathan Essex	Nick Harrison
Party	Conservative	Green	Residents
Last election	27 seats, 36.6%	9 seats, 23.8%	6 seats, 7.4%
Seats before	26	9	6
Seats won	7	4	2
Seats after	23	11	6
Seat change	▼3	▲2	Steady
Popular vote	13,461	8,252	2,582
Percentage	37.8%	23.2%	7.3%
Swing	▲1.2%	▼0.6%	▼0.1%
	Fourth party	Fifth party	Sixth party
Leader	Stephen Kulka
Party	Liberal Democrats	Labour	Independent
Last election	3 seats, 10.4%	0 seats, 17.7%	1 seat, 3.4%
Seats before	3	0	1
Seats won	1	1	0
Seats after	3	1	1
Seat change	Steady	▲1	Steady
Popular vote	5,117	6,027	0
Percentage	14.4%	16.9%	0.0%
Swing	▲4.0%	▼0.8%	▼3.4%
Leader before election
Mark Brunt
Conservative
Leader after election
Richard Biggs
Conservative

The 2023 Reigate and Banstead Borough Council election took place on 4 May 2023 to elect members of Reigate and Banstead Borough Council in Surrey, England. This was on the same day as other local elections in England.

== Summary ==
The council was under Conservative majority control prior to the election. The leader of the council, Mark Brunt, chose not to stand for re-election.

The Conservatives retained their majority at the election, but lost seats to both the Greens and Labour. They were left with a majority of just one seat. Conservative councillor Richard Biggs was appointed the new leader of the council at the subsequent annual council meeting on 25 May 2023.

== Overall results ==
2023 Reigate and Banstead Borough Council election
Party	This election			Full council			This election		
Party	Seats	Net	Seats %	Other	Total	Total %	Votes	Votes %	+/−
Conservative	7	▼3	46.7	16	23	51.1	13,461	37.8	▲1.2
Green	4	▲2	26.7	7	11	24.4	8,252	23.2	▼0.6
Residents	2	Steady	13.3	4	6	13.3	2,582	7.3	▼0.1
Liberal Democrats	1	Steady	6.7	2	3	6.7	5,117	14.4	▲4.0
Labour	1	▲1	6.7	0	1	2.2	6,027	16.9	▼0.8
Independent	0	Steady	0.0	1	1	2.2	N/A	N/A	▼3.4
Reform UK	0	Steady	0.0	0	0	0.0	174	0.5	▼0.2

== Ward results ==
The Statement of Persons Nominated, which details the candidates standing in each ward, was released by Reigate and Banstead Borough Council following the close of nominations on 5 April 2023. The results for each ward were as follows, with an asterisk (*) indicating an incumbent councillor standing for re-election.

=== Banstead Village ===
Banstead Village
Party	Candidate	Votes	%	±%
Conservative	Eddy Humphreys*	1,347	62.4	+17.4
Labour	Scott Barrington	337	15.6	+5.6
Liberal Democrats	Andrew Knights	275	12.7	+4.2
Green	Jennie Pope	201	9.3	+2.8
Majority		1,010	46.8	
Turnout		2,160	32.4	–4.1
Registered electors		6,673		
Conservative hold		Swing	▲5.9	

=== Chipstead, Kingswood and Woodmansterne ===
Chipstead, Kingswood and Woodmansterne
Party	Candidate	Votes	%	±%
Conservative	Jed Dwight	1,477	62.8	+0.7
Green	Sophie Rowlands	308	13.1	–8.0
Labour	Chris Salmen	286	12.2	–4.7
Liberal Democrats	Mark Johnston	282	12.0	N/A
Majority		1,169	49.7	
Turnout		2,353	32.2	–2.0
Registered electors		7,313		
Conservative hold		Swing	▼4.4	

=== Earlswood and Whitebushes ===
Earlswood and Whitebushes
Party	Candidate	Votes	%	±%
Green	Della Torra	1,360	58.4	–6.9
Conservative	Barbara Thomson	507	21.8	+1.5
Labour	Jenny Orchard	337	14.5	+0.1
Liberal Democrats	Lexi Lawrence	123	5.3	N/A
Majority		853	36.6	
Turnout		2,327	33.1	–1.5
Registered electors		7,037		
Green hold		Swing	▼4.2	

=== Hooley, Merstham and Netherne ===
Hooley, Merstham and Netherne
Party	Candidate	Votes	%	±%
Green	Shasha Khan	929	37.4	+12.0
Conservative	Tim Peniston-Bird	717	28.9	–6.2
Labour	Rex Giles	573	23.1	–3.8
Liberal Democrats	Graham Burr	263	10.6	–2.0
Majority		212	8.5	
Turnout		2,482	31.0	–3.5
Registered electors		8,018		
Green gain from Conservative		Swing	▲9.1	

=== Horley Central and South ===
Horley Central and South
Party	Candidate	Votes	%	±%
Conservative	Jerry Hudson*	840	39.9	–8.2
Labour	Lynnette Easterbrook	560	26.6	–3.3
Green	Alan Mitchell	267	12.7	–1.4
Liberal Democrats	Stuart Holmes	266	12.6	N/A
Reform UK	Chris Scott	174	8.3	+0.4
Majority		280	13.3	
Turnout		2,107	28.8	–2.3
Registered electors		7,305		
Conservative hold		Swing	▼2.5	

=== Horley East and Salfords ===
Horley East and Salfords
Party	Candidate	Votes	%	±%
Green	Jason Thorne	1,019	42.1	+0.4
Conservative	Tony Schofield*	855	35.3	–5.4
Labour	Steel Horton	335	13.8	–3.8
Liberal Democrats	Robin Lawrence	211	8.7	N/A
Majority		164	6.8	
Turnout		2,420	34.5	–0.9
Registered electors		7,024		
Green gain from Conservative		Swing	▲2.9	

=== Horley West and Sidlow ===
Horley West and Sidlow
Party	Candidate	Votes	%	±%
Conservative	Richard Biggs*	937	40.0	–8.2
Labour	Tom Turner	778	33.2	–2.5
Liberal Democrats	Steve Wotton	390	16.7	+0.6
Green	Neville Kemp	236	10.1	N/A
Majority		159	6.8	
Turnout		2,341	29.0	–0.1
Registered electors		8,080		
Conservative hold		Swing	▼2.9	

=== Lower Kingswood, Tadworth and Walton ===
Lower Kingswood, Tadworth and Walton
Party	Candidate	Votes	%	±%
Conservative	Ben Green	1,617	62.6	+0.1
Liberal Democrats	Gregory Ardan	514	19.9	N/A
Labour	David Burnley	453	17.5	+1.2
Majority		1,103	42.7	
Turnout		2,584	33.6	–1.8
Registered electors		7,692		
Conservative hold		Swing	N/A	

=== Meadvale and St. John's ===
Meadvale and St. John’s
Party	Candidate	Votes	%	±%
Liberal Democrats	Steve Kulka*	1,210	45.0	–11.4
Conservative	Jonathan White	738	27.5	+0.4
Green	Philippa Martin	454	16.9	N/A
Labour	John Berge	286	10.6	–5.8
Majority		472	17.5	
Turnout		2,688	40.7	–1.9
Registered electors		6,606		
Liberal Democrats hold		Swing	▼5.9	

=== Nork ===
Nork
Party	Candidate	Votes	%	±%
Residents	Gemma Adamson*	1,345	56.8	–3.9
Conservative	Pamela Freeman	615	26.0	+3.2
Labour	Calli Mistry	191	8.1	–0.7
Green	Flip Bakker	139	5.9	–1.7
Liberal Democrats	Claude Knights	76	3.2	N/A
Majority		730	30.8	
Turnout		2,366	33.2	–1.7
Registered electors		7,132		
Residents hold		Swing	▼3.6	

=== Redhill East ===
Redhill East
Party	Candidate	Votes	%	±%
Green	Jonathan Essex*	1,504	71.0	+6.9
Conservative	James Dodsworth	303	14.3	–3.2
Labour	Mark Scott	217	10.2	–1.5
Liberal Democrats	Philip Risk	94	4.4	–2.3
Majority		1,201	56.7	
Turnout		2,118	33.8	–2.1
Registered electors		6,273		
Green hold		Swing	▲5.1	

=== Redhill West and Wray Common ===
Redhill West and Wray Common
Party	Candidate	Votes	%	±%
Labour	Mark Smith	893	35.8	+8.4
Conservative	Ronnie Hutchings	864	34.6	+1.3
Green	Leon Deith	378	15.1	–4.0
Liberal Democrats	Gemma Roulston	362	14.5	–5.7
Majority		29	1.2	
Turnout		2,497	35.2	–1.4
Registered electors		7,104		
Labour gain from Conservative		Swing	▲3.6	

=== Reigate ===
Reigate
Party	Candidate	Votes	%	±%
Conservative	Kate Fairhurst	1,260	44.2	+9.4
Liberal Democrats	Jemma de Vincenzo	859	30.2	+6.3
Green	Claire Thorpe	446	15.7	+0.2
Labour	Ian Thirlwall	283	9.9	+1.8
Majority		401	14.0	
Turnout		2,848	38.8	–2.9
Registered electors		7,337		
Conservative hold		Swing	▲1.6	

=== South Park and Woodhatch ===
South Park and Woodhatch
Party	Candidate	Votes	%	±%
Conservative	James King*	1,093	46.1	+19.9
Green	Natasha Hobbs	942	39.7	–17.0
Labour	Marcus Ward	216	9.1	–4.0
Liberal Democrats	Christopher Howell	121	5.1	N/A
Majority		151	6.4	
Turnout		2,372	37.2	+1.9
Registered electors		6,370		
Conservative hold		Swing	▲18.5	

=== Tattenham Corner and Preston ===
Tattenham Corner and Preston
Party	Candidate	Votes	%	±%
Residents	Jill Bray*	1,237	63.4	+3.4
Conservative	Aaron Doherty	291	14.9	–5.0
Labour	Steve Boeje	282	14.5	–0.2
Liberal Democrats	Moray Carey	71	3.6	N/A
Green	Alistair Morten	69	3.5	–2.0
Majority		946	48.5	
Turnout		1,950	26.7	–2.2
Registered electors		7,302		
Residents hold		Swing	▲4.2	
