= Reigate Town Hall =

Municipal building in Reigate, Surrey, England

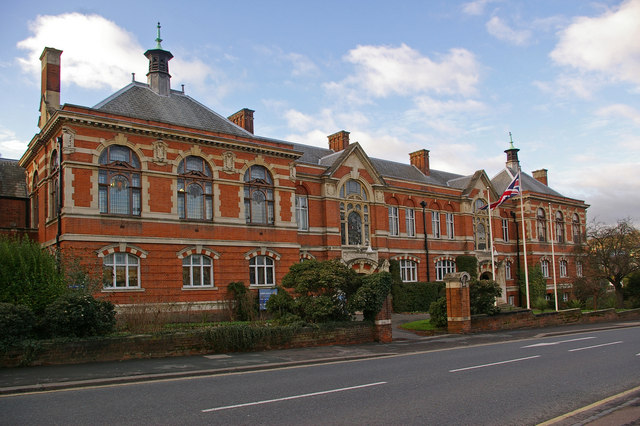
- Reigate Town Hall

- Shown in Surrey
- 51.2394°N 0.2051°W
- Location: Castlefield Road, Reigate

History
- Built: 1901

Site notes
- Architect(s): Macintosh and Newman
- Architectural style: Arts and Crafts style

Listed Building – Grade II
- Official name: Town Hall
- Designated: 22 October 1991
- Reference no.: 1260489

Listed Building – Grade II
- Official name: Wall and gate piers
- Designated: 22 October 1991
- Reference no.: 1241404

Reigate Town Hall is a municipal building in Castlefield Road, Reigate, Surrey, England. The town hall, which is the meeting place of Reigate and Banstead Borough Council, is a Grade II listed building.

== History ==
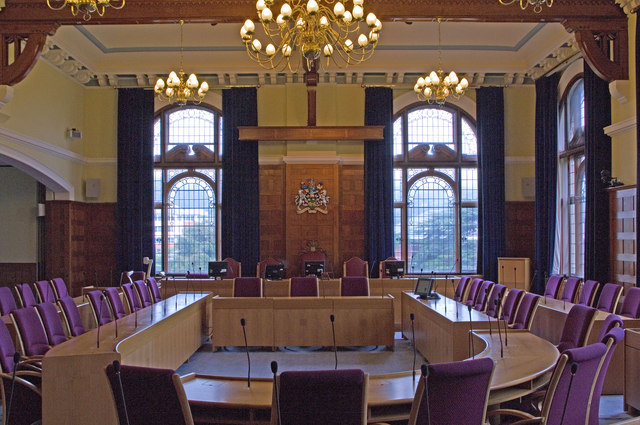
The new council chamber

The building was commissioned to replace the old town hall with had been built on the north side of the High Street in 1798. After civic leaders found that the old building was inadequate for their needs, they decided to procure a new town hall: the site they selected had previously been open land to the east of Reigate Castle.

The new town hall was designed by Macintosh and Newman in the Arts and Crafts style, built at a cost of £25,000 and completed in 1901. The design involved a symmetrical main frontage with twelve bays facing onto Castlefield Road with the end three bays at each end projected forward as pavilions with hipped roofs and turrets; the central section of six bays featured a doorway in the penultimate bay from the left which gave access to the municipal buildings wing located on the left, as well as a doorway in the penultimate bay from the right which gave access to the courthouse and police wing located on the right.

Above the two doorways were modified stained glass Venetian windows (decorated with rose motifs on the municipal buildings side and the Royal coat of arms on the courthouse side) with gables above. Internally, the principal rooms were the council chamber, which was decorated in an Art Nouveau style with a fine ceiling, in the municipal buildings wing, and the magistrates' court, which was oak panelled, in the courthouse wing. The fire station, which featured a four-storey tower with a pagoda style roof, formed a separate structure to the left. After the First World War, a memorial board was hung on a wall in the town hall to commemorate the lives of local service personnel who had died in the war.

The building served as the headquarters of Reigate Municipal Borough Council and remained the local seat of government when the enlarged Reigate and Banstead Borough Council was formed in 1974. The borough council secured access to the whole complex once the police had moved to Cherchefelle in 1943, the fire service had moved to Croydon Road in 1955 and the courts service had moved to Hatchlands Road in the early 1970s.

Works of art in the town hall include a landscape by Henry Tanworth Wells depicting a cart being loaded at a quarry at Holmbury Hill and painting by George Hooper depicting a garden at Loxwood.
