= 2008 Reigate and Banstead Borough Council election =

2008 English local government election

Map of the 2008 Reigate and Banstead Borough Council election

The 2008 Reigate and Banstead Borough Council election took place on 1 May 2008 to elect a third of the members of Reigate and Banstead Borough Council, the borough of Reigate and Banstead in England. This was on the same day as the other 2008 United Kingdom local elections. The previous council election took place in 2007 and the following election was held in 2010. In the election, the council stayed under Conservative control.

== Results ==
Party	Previous	Seats +/-	2008
Conservative	41	▼2	39
Residents Association	6	Steady	6
Liberal Democrat	2	▲1	3
Labour	1	Steady	1
Others	1	▼1	2

== See also ==
- Reigate and Banstead Borough Council elections
