= Netherne-on-the-Hill =

Village in Surrey, England

Coordinates: 51.292408°N 0.140556°W

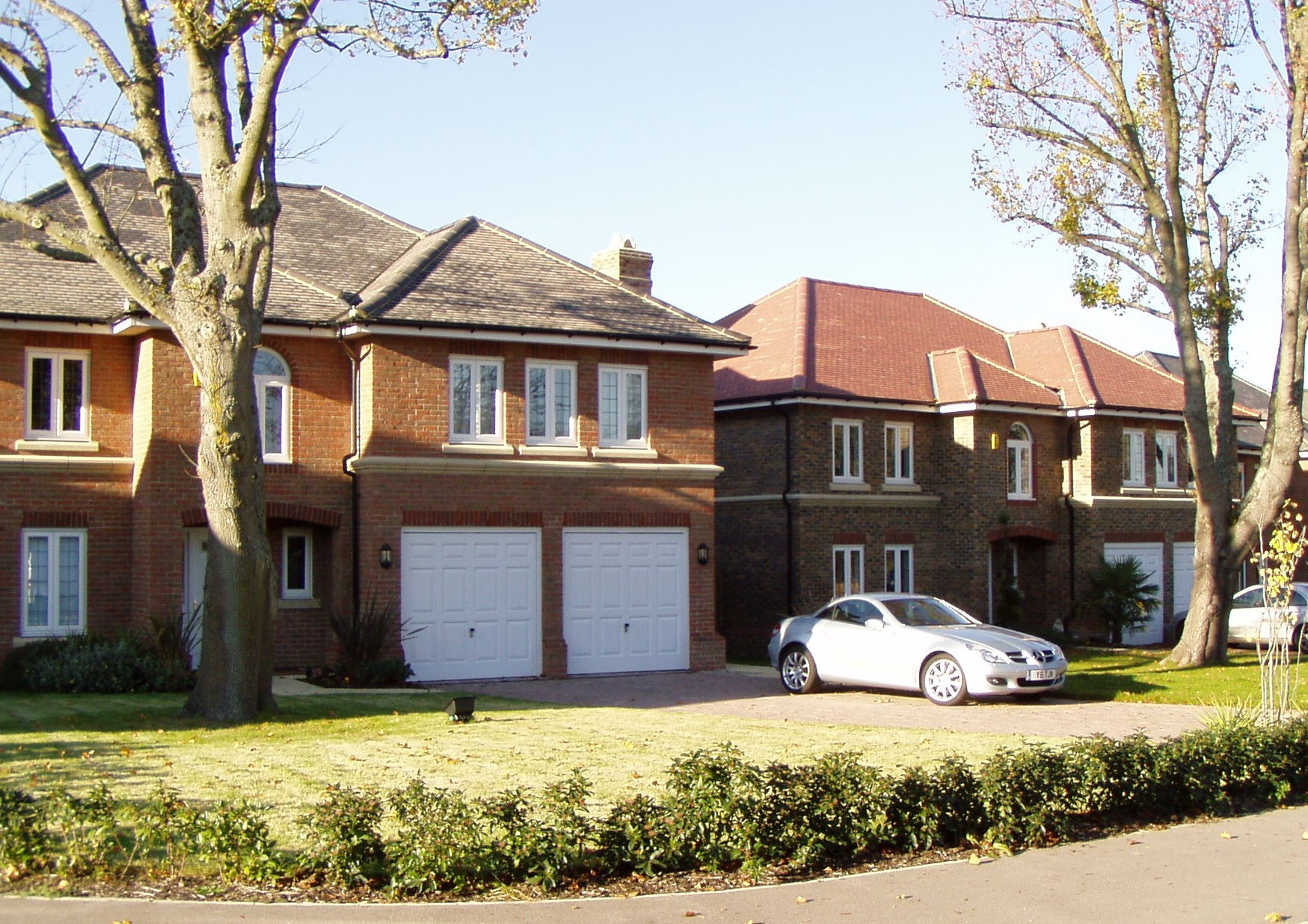
- Homes added in the first decade of the 21st century

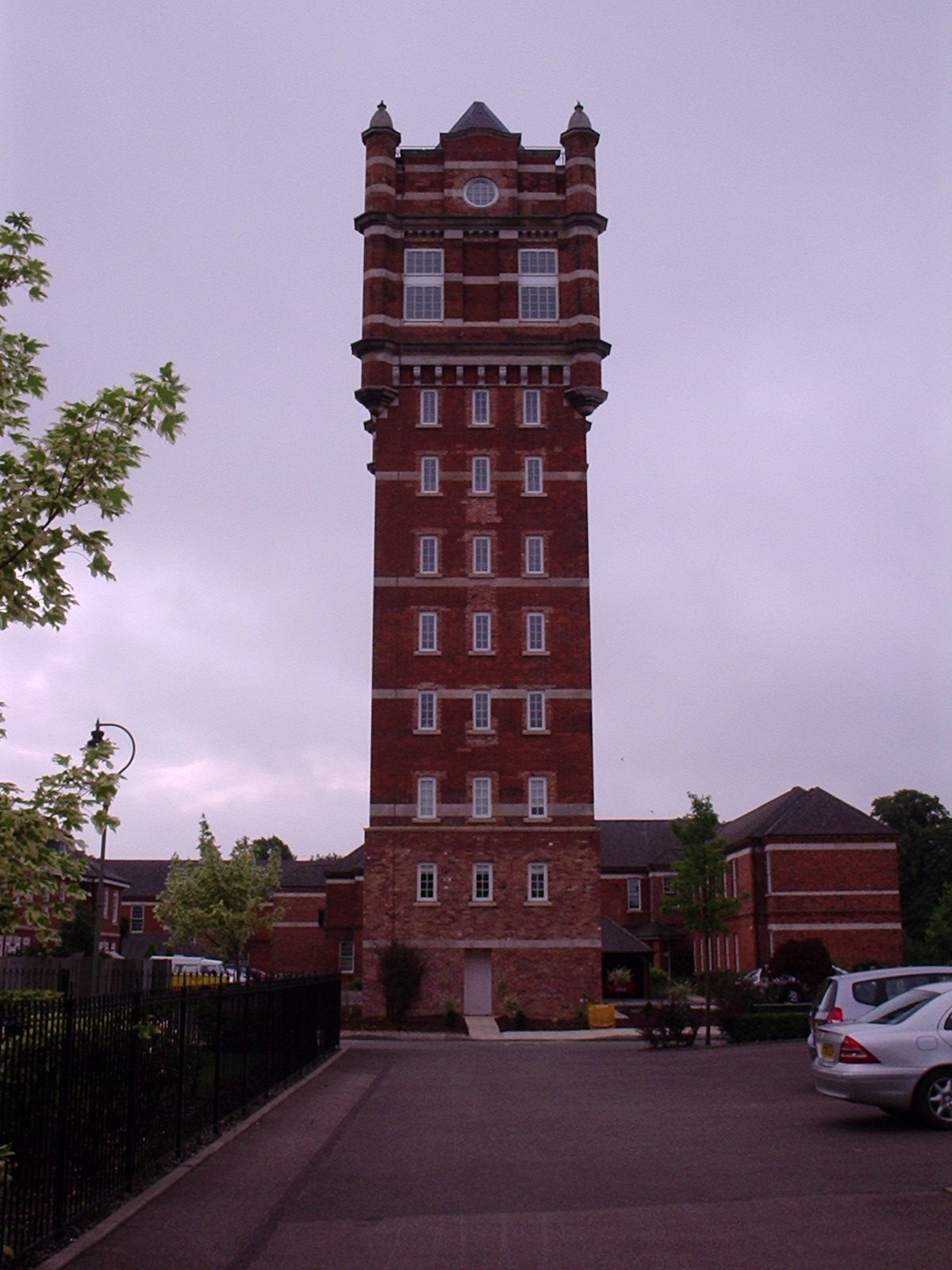
- Apartments occupying a former water tower serving Hooley and the hospital

- Location within Surrey
- Population: 1,458 (2011 census)
- OS grid reference: TQ297564
- District: Reigate and Banstead
- Shire county: Surrey
- Region: South East
- Country: England
- Sovereign state: United Kingdom
- Post town: Coulsdon
- Postcode district: CR5
- Dialling code: 01737
- Police: Surrey
- Fire: Surrey
- Ambulance: South East Coast
- UK Parliament: East Surrey

Netherne-on-the-Hill is a village in Surrey, England, occupying a plateau once home to Netherne Hospital. The village is across a narrow valley from Hooley in north of the borough of Reigate and Banstead; through the valley runs the Hooley Tunnel cutting and A23, the only road from which the village can be accessed, from two designated side roads; a few metres south of the southern T-junction, the road divides into two grades: the A23 to Redhill, 3 miles (4.8 km) south, and the M23 motorway which has a junction with the M25 motorway within Merstham's boundaries, the former village of the hilltop land. The post town, Coulsdon in Greater London is centred 1.8 miles (2.9 km) due north.

== History ==
Unlike Hooley which was mostly part of Coulsdon manor and parish, the land here was within the traditional boundaries of Merstham as a village, that is within its ecclesiastical parish. The property called Netherne – 'Lez Nedder' in 1522 – was acquired in the first decade of the 20th century by the Surrey County Council for an asylum; the quit-rent payable yearly for the land of a little over half of one pound sterling recorded in 1522 was enfranchised from the land by the Council paying its owner.

Being on the ridge of the North Downs, the relevant mineral prosperity of the parish was important at the slopes straddling this particular plateau, very sparsely inhabited though it was, and increasingly bereft of water, being aloft of aquifers. The county history of 1911 states:

...chalk at Merstham has also been long famous for its lime. The lime produced is not quite equal to the Dorking and Betchworth, but superior to the Guildford product. The lime used to be extensively used as manure, and is still so employed. Cement is also now made from it. The mineral works at Merstham helped to bring about improved means of conveyance. The mediaeval line of carriage was by cart to Battersea for conveyance by water to Westminster, and to Kingston upon Thames for water carriage to Windsor.

=== 20th century psychiatric care ===
Netherne Hospital opened in 1903 as a pleasant asylum for psychiatric patients. The complex could house up to 2000 patients at its peak and its founders built its own laundry, power station, sewage works, farm and sporting facilities. The hospital was known to be progressive in its treatment of mental illnesses, including in its use of art therapy and psychiatric rehabilitation. It closed in 1994 following the community integration of most of its patients.

The hospital chapel is now home to the new community's swimming pool and gym. Notwithstanding this history, little remains at all apart from a minority of converted buildings including the iconic main administration building, several ward block, villas, staff houses, the upper lodge ( now a shop) and the water tower. The central area comprising the original administration building, the water tower, two ward blocks, and four smaller detached buildings now form the Netherne on the Hill Conservation area, and are locally listed.

=== Conversion to residential estate ===
The former hospital estate was sold by the Department of Health to M J Gleeson in 1995, with development of a new village commencing shortly afterwards. The development was to have included about 440 houses, a nursing home, a business centre, a shop, a public house and recreational open space. The developer Gleeson never built the nursing home, business centre or public house, and sold much of the land to other developers after having to pay for expensive essential works to the road bridge spanning two deep railway cuttings close to the A23 to the west of the village.

== Demography ==
Demography is difficult to quantify precisely for the village. No designated UK ward had yet been created for Netherne-on-the-Hill in local government in time for the 2011 United Kingdom census.

However the village formed in 2011 approximately half of the Lower Output Area Reigate and Banstead 004E, whose population was 2,698 clustered into divisions of this village and Hooley, altogether covering 431 hectares (1,070 acres). This gave a density which is valid for the settlement approximately, therefore, of 6.3 persons per hectare. The population if exactly half would be 1,349, which provides an approximation for both.

== Amenities ==
Netherne's amenities mainly comprise a village shop, indoor swimming pool and gym, tennis courts, football and cricket pitches, but the bowls club was knocked down as the building was not safe . A village hall opened in the former recreation hall in 2011, housing parent & baby groups, quiz nights, scouts/brownie, dance classes and parties. The cricket pavilion has been acquired by the management company of the village and is available for private hire. Since October 2017 a community cafe runs two days a week. The village has a website which has details of all the amenities which can be found at www.nmanltd.com. There was a commuter minibus that ran to Coulsdon South station at peak times during the week but this stopped during covid lockdown and has not restarted. The village is set in extensive landscaped grounds totally around 80 acres, in the joint ownership of the home owners in the village.

== Notes and references ==
Notes
