= 2012 Reigate and Banstead Borough Council election =

2012 UK local government election

Results of the 2012 Reigate and Banstead Borough Council election

The 2012 Reigate and Banstead Council election took place on 3 May 2012 to elect members of Reigate and Banstead Borough Council in Surrey, England. One third of the council was elected,. The Conservative Party remained in overall control of the council.

== Election result ==
The composition of the council after the election was:

- Conservative: 37 (+2)
- Reigate and Banstead Residents Association: 7 (0)
- Green Party of England and Wales: 3 (+1)
- Liberal Democrat: 2 (-1)
- Independent: 2 (-2)

Reigate and Banstead local election result 2012
Party	Seats	Gains	Losses	Net gain/loss	Seats %	Votes %	Votes	+/−
Conservative								
Reigate and Banstead Residents Association								
Green								
Liberal Democrats								
Independent								
UKIP								
Labour								

=== Ward results ===
Banstead Village
Party	Candidate	Votes	%	±%
Conservative	Eddy Humphries	1,163		
UKIP	Chris Byrne	338		
Labour	Andrew Bonser	214		
Green	Philip Wilson	146		
Majority		825		
Turnout			29.09	
Conservative hold		Swing		

Chipstead, Hooley and Woodmansterne
Party	Candidate	Votes	%	±%
Conservative	Keith Foreman	895		
Downlands Resident Group	Richard Wagner	757		
UKIP	Stephen Russell	215		
Labour	Patricia Johnson	185		
Liberal Democrats	Moray Carey	103		
Majority		118		
Turnout			32.29	
Conservative hold		Swing		

Earlswood and Whitebushes
Party	Candidate	Votes	%	±%
Conservative	James Durrant	597		
Labour	Helen Young	560		
Liberal Democrats	Jane Kulka	260		
Green	Katie Smith	242		
UKIP	Joseph Fox	229		
Majority		27		
Turnout			28.69	
Conservative hold		Swing		

Horley Central
Party	Candidate	Votes	%	±%
Conservative	Allen Kay	724		
UKIP	Christian Stevens	348		
Labour	Linda Mabbett	326		
Liberal Democrats	Tim Deevoy	178		
Majority		376		
Turnout			25.56	
Conservative hold		Swing		

Horley East
Party	Candidate	Votes	%	±%
Conservative	Tony Schofield	824		
Labour	Bob Fromant	222		
Liberal Democrats	Sally Deevoy	201		
Majority		602		
Turnout			26.89	
Conservative hold		Swing		

Horley West
Party	Candidate	Votes	%	±%
Conservative	David Powell	666		
UKIP	Denese Brooke-Harte	433		
Labour	Gerry O'Dwyer	247		
Liberal Democrats	Barry Hamilton	168		
Majority		233		
Turnout			26.09	
Conservative hold		Swing		

Kingswood with Burgh Heath
Party	Candidate	Votes	%	±%
Conservative	Simon Parnell	1,115		
UKIP	Bob Cambridge	413		
Labour	Gareth Williams	155		
Majority		702		
Turnout			31.04	
Conservative hold		Swing		

Meadvale and St. John's
Party	Candidate	Votes	%	±%
Conservative	Patsy Shillinglaw	867		
Liberal Democrats	Alanna Coombes	854		
Labour	Neil Walton	284		
Majority		13		
Turnout			35.39	
Conservative hold		Swing		

Merstham
Party	Candidate	Votes	%	±%
Conservative	Mark Brunt	785		
Labour	Julie Halford	402		
Liberal Democrats	Steve Oddy	251		
UKIP	Valarie Moore	182		
Green	James Richardson	105		
Majority		383		
Turnout			30.27	
Conservative hold		Swing		

Nork
Party	Candidate	Votes	%	±%
Nork Residents' Association	Norman Harris	1,361		
Conservative	Julie Tomlinson	417		
Majority		954		
Turnout			30.37	
Nork Residents' Association hold		Swing		

Redhill East
Party	Candidate	Votes	%	±%
Green	Bryn Trscott	1,216		
Conservative	Rois Amiah	787		
Labour	Rhys Williams	390		
Liberal Democrats	Robert Kulka	108		
Majority		429		
Turnout			34.65	
Green gain from Conservative		Swing		

Redhill West
Party	Candidate	Votes	%	±%
Conservative	Natalie Bramhall	812		
Labour	Stewart Dack	396		
Green	Stephen McKenna	313		
UKIP	Timothy Pearson	258		
Liberal Democrats	Andrew Cressy	164		
Majority		416		
Turnout			32.75	
Conservative hold		Swing		

Reigate Central
Party	Candidate	Votes	%	±%
Independent	Christopher Whinney	869		
Conservative	Richard Coad	643		
Liberal Democrats	Helen Kulka	314		
Labour	Graham Wildridge	167		
UKIP	Stephen Smith	114		
Majority		226		
Turnout			38.42	
Independent hold		Swing		

Reigate Hill
Party	Candidate	Votes	%	±%
Conservative	Roger Newstead	853		
Liberal Democrats	Chris Howell	198		
UKIP	Yvonne Larg	186		
Labour	Andrew Saunders	152		
Majority		651		
Turnout			33.78	
Conservative hold		Swing		

South Park and Woodhatch
Party	Candidate	Votes	%	±%
Conservative	Stephen Bramhall	690		
Labour	John Berge	457		
Liberal Democrats	Anthony Lambell	300		
Majority		233		
Turnout			27.56	
Conservative hold		Swing		

Reigate Central
Party	Candidate	Votes	%	±%
Conservative	Victor Broad	1,154		
UKIP	Phyllis Cambridge	292		
Liberal Democrats	Hannah Martin	145		
Green	Alistair Morten	105		
Labour	Robin Spencer	102		
Majority		856		
Turnout			32.94	
Conservative hold		Swing		

Tattenhams
Party	Candidate	Votes	%	±%
Tattenhams Residents' Association	Jill Bray	869		
Conservative	Philip Olanipekun	276		
Majority		593		
Turnout			29.97	
Tattenhams Residents' Association hold		Swing		
