= Charlwood and Horley Act 1974 =

Act of the Parliament of the United Kingdom

Charlwood and Horley Act 1974 (Note: Section 3.)
- Act of Parliament
- Parliament of the United Kingdom
- Long title: An Act to transfer parts of the new parishes of Charlwood and Horley to the new county of Surrey, and for connected purposes.
- Citation: 1974 c. 11
- Introduced by: Graham Page (Commons)
- Territorial extent: United Kingdom

Dates
- Royal assent: 8 February 1974
- Commencement: 8 February 1974 (Note: The Acts of Parliament (Commencement) Act 1793.)
Other legislation
Amended by	Statute Law (Repeals) Act 2004

Status: Partially repealed

Text of statute as originally enacted

Revised text of statute as amended

Text of the Charlwood and Horley Act 1974 as in force today (including any amendments) within the United Kingdom, from legislation.gov.uk.

The Charlwood and Horley Act 1974 (c. 11) is an act of the Parliament of the United Kingdom that amended the Local Government Act 1972 to move the village of Charlwood and the town of Horley from West Sussex to Surrey.

The 1972 act had provided for the transfer of Gatwick Airport and the parishes of Charlwood and Horley from Surrey to West Sussex. The transfer was opposed by Surrey County Council, Dorking and Horley Rural District Council and Charlwood and Horley Parish Councils. Arguments against the transfer included the loss of expertise built up by the Surrey local authorities on airport management and planning, loss of territories to school catchment areas and remote administration from Chichester. It was also suggested that the areas were likely to be administered as part of Crawley New Town, with which they had no linkage. On 5 December 1971 a demonstration by 1,500 residents disrupted traffic on the main London to Brighton road at the proposed boundary.

On 27 January 1972, Michael Heseltine, Under-Secretary of State for the Environment, stated that the transfer of the airport would go ahead, but that the question of whether the two villages would remain in Surrey was not finally decided. Surrey County Council's proposed amendments to keep Gatwick within the county were rejected by the House of Commons in July 1972, but the council decided to take its case to the House of Lords.

On 17 October 1973, it was announced that the government would be holding negotiations about the Surrey/West Sussex boundary. The Charlwood and Horley Bill was introduced to Parliament on 31 October 1973. It passed all stages on the last day of the parliamentary session and received royal assent on 8 February 1974.

From 1 April 1974 there was a realignment of civil parish boundaries, and a new parish was created:

- Charlwood in Mole Valley district
- Horley in Reigate and Banstead district
- Salfords and Sidlow: created from parts of Charlwood and Horley parishes, and included in Reigate and Banstead

The portion included in West Sussex became part of the unparished area of Crawley district.

== Subsequent developments ==
Section 2(3) of the act was repealed by section 1(1) of, and group 1 of part 10 of schedule 1 to, the Statute Law (Repeals) Act 2004, which came into force on 22 July 2004.
