= 2022 Reigate and Banstead Borough Council election =

Local election in Surrey, England

← 2021	5 May 2022	2023 →

15 out of 45 seats to Reigate and Banstead Borough Council 23 seats needed for a majority

	First party	Second party	Third party
Party	Conservative	Green	Liberal Democrats
Last election	28 seats, 47.1%	7 seats, 20.9%	3 seats, 8.9%
Seats won	8	4	1
Seats after	27	9	3
Seat change	▼1	▲2	Steady
Popular vote	13,696	8,914	3,898
Percentage	36.6%	23.8%	10.4%
Swing	▼10.5%	▲2.9%	▲1.5%
- Winner of each seat at the 2022 Reigate and Banstead Borough Council election
Council control before election
Conservative
Council control after election
Conservative

The 2022 Reigate and Banstead Borough Council election took place on 5 May 2022 to elect members to Reigate and Banstead Borough Council in England coinciding with other local elections. Fifteen of the council's 45 seats were up for election.

The Conservatives won eight of the fifteen seats available, retaining control of the council which they have held since 2000. The Green Party gained two seats, Horley East & Salfords and South Park & Woodhatch, from the Conservatives to remain the second-largest party. The only other seat to switch parties was Reigate which the Conservatives won from the independent incumbent Christopher Whinney.

== Results summary ==
2022 Reigate and Banstead Borough Council election
Party	This election			Full council			This election		
Party	Seats	Net	Seats %	Other	Total	Total %	Votes	Votes %	+/−
Conservative	8	▼1	53.3	19	27	60.0	13,696	36.6	-10.5
Green	4	▲2	26.7	5	9	20.0	8,914	23.8	+2.9
Liberal Democrats	1	Steady	6.7	2	3	6.7	3,898	10.4	+1.5
Nork RA	1	Steady	6.7	2	3	6.7	1,524	4.1	-0.1
Tattenham RA	1	Steady	6.7	2	3	6.7	1,243	3.3	+0.6
Labour	0	Steady	0.0	0	0	0.0	6,634	17.7	+1.8
Independent	0	▼1	0.0	0	0	0.0	1,278	3.4	N/A
Reform UK	0	Steady	0.0	0	0	0.0	271	0.7	N/A

== Ward results ==
=== Banstead Village ===
Banstead Village
Party	Candidate	Votes	%	±%
Conservative	Sam Walsh	1,102	45.0	−23.5
Independent	Mario Hayns	738	30.1	N/A
Labour	Ian Thirlwall	243	10.0	0.0
Liberal Democrats	Moray William Carey	208	8.5	−0.8
Green	Jennifer Pope	158	6.5	−5.7
Majority		354	14.5	
Turnout		2,449	36.5	−1.5
Conservative hold		Swing		

=== Chipstead, Kingswood and Woodansterne ===
Chipstead, Kingswood and Woodansterne
Party	Candidate	Votes	%	±%
Conservative	Simon Parnall	1,562	62.1	−10.1
Green	Shasha Khan	530	21.1	+5.7
Labour	Geoff Eales	425	16.9	+4.5
Majority		1,032	41.0	
Turnout		2,517	34.2	−4.8
Conservative hold		Swing		

=== Earlswood and Whitebushes ===
Earlswood and Whitebushes
Party	Candidate	Votes	%	±%
Green	Ruth Ritter	1,604	65.3	+6.7
Conservative	Kate Fairhurst	499	20.3	−14.9
Labour	Mark Scott	353	14.4	+2.5
Majority		1,105	45.0	
Turnout		2,456	34.6	−3.4
Green hold		Swing		

=== Hooley, Merstham and Netherne ===
Hooley, Merstham and Netherne
Party	Candidate	Votes	%	±%
Conservative	Mus Tary	958	35.1	−7.1
Labour	Mick Hay	734	26.9	−4.4
Green	Sam Dilliway-Davies	694	25.4	+2.1
Liberal Democrats	Graham Burr	343	12.6	−8.8
Majority		224	8.2	
Turnout		2,729	34.5	−0.5
Conservative hold		Swing		

=== Horley Central and South ===
Horley Central and South
Party	Candidate	Votes	%	±%
Conservative	Hannah Avery	1,101	48.1	−9.5
Labour	Lynnette Easterbrook	684	29.9	+3.6
Green	Neville Kemp	323	14.1	−2.0
Reform UK	Chris Scott	181	7.9	N/A
Majority		417		
Turnout		2,289	31.1	−1.9
Conservative hold		Swing		

=== Horley East and Salfords ===
Horley East and Salfords
Party	Candidate	Votes	%	±%
Green	Victoria Chester	1,049	41.7	−0.4
Conservative	Robert Marr	1,025	40.7	−18.1
Labour	Tom Latter	444	17.6	−0.3
Majority		24	1.0	
Turnout		2,518	35.4	−0.6
Green gain from Conservative		Swing		

=== Horley West and Sidlow ===
Horley West and Sidlow
Party	Candidate	Votes	%	±%
Conservative	James Baker	1,079	48.2	−10.6
Labour	Cecilia Hughes	798	35.7	+8.6
Liberal Democrats	Steve Wotton	361	16.1	+2.0
Majority		281	12.6	
Turnout		2,238	29.1	−0.9
Conservative hold		Swing		

=== Lower Kingswood, Tadworth and Walton ===
Banstead Village
Party	Candidate	Votes	%	±%
Conservative	Rod Ashford	1,720	62.5	−5.3
Green	Roger Ponsford	584	21.2	+10.9
Labour	David Burnley	448	16.3	+7.2
Majority		1,136	41.3	
Turnout		2,752	35.4	−3.6
Conservative hold		Swing		

=== Meadvale and St. John's ===
Meadvale and St. John's
Party	Candidate	Votes	%	±%
Liberal Democrats	Christopher Thompson	1,585	56.4	+13.4
Conservative	Ronnie Hutchings	762	27.1	−11.5
Labour	Rosie Norgrove	461	16.4	−0.1
Majority		823	29.3	
Turnout		2,808	42.6	+0.6
Liberal Democrats hold		Swing		

=== Nork ===
Nork
Party	Candidate	Votes	%	±%
Nork RA	George Hinton	1,524	60.7	+8.7
Conservative	Pamela Freeman	572	22.8	−1.5
Labour	Calli Mistry	222	8.8	+3.2
Green	Flip Bakker	192	7.6	N/A
Majority		952	37.9	−0.1
Turnout		2,510	34.9	
Nork RA hold		Swing		

=== Redhill East ===
Redhill East
Party	Candidate	Votes	%	±%
Green	Stephen McKenna	1,414	64.1	−0.7
Conservative	Shysta Manzoor	385	17.5	−6.1
Labour	Rex Giles	259	11.7	+0.1
Liberal Democrats	Stuart Holmes	148	6.7	N/A
Majority		1,029	46.6	
Turnout		2,206	35.9	−3.1
Green hold		Swing		

=== Redhill West and Wray Common ===
Redhill West and Wray Common
Party	Candidate	Votes	%	±%
Conservative	Rich Michalowski	867	33.3	−9.3
Labour	Mark Smith	715	27.4	+8.2
Liberal Democrats	Jemma De Vincenzo	525	20.2	+1.7
Green	Frank Percy	498	19.1	−0.6
Majority		152	5.8	
Turnout		2,605	36.6	−1.4
Conservative hold		Swing		

=== Reigate ===
Reigate
Party	Candidate	Votes	%	±%
Conservative	Victor Lewanski	1,062	34.8	−14.4
Liberal Democrats	John Vincent	728	23.9	+2.9
Independent	Christopher Whinney	540	17.7	N/A
Green	Claire Thorpe	474	15.5	−4.8
Labour	Tony Robinson	248	8.1	−1.4
Majority		334	10.9	
Turnout		3,052	41.7	+2.3
Conservative gain from Independent		Swing		

=== South Park and Woodhatch ===
South Park and Woodhatch
Party	Candidate	Votes	%	±%
Green	Andrew Proudfoot	1,280	56.7	+4.4
Conservative	Chris Reynolds	590	26.2	−10.0
Labour	Linda Giles	296	13.1	+1.6
Reform UK	Joseph Fox	90	4.0	N/A
Majority		690	30.6	
Turnout		2,256	35.3	−3.7
Green gain from Conservative		Swing		

=== Tattenham Corner and Preston ===
Tattenham Corner and Preston
Party	Candidate	Votes	%	±%
Tattenham RA	Nick Harrison	1,243	60.0	+2.6
Conservative	Aaron Doherty	412	19.9	−3.6
Labour	Steve Boeje	304	14.7	+3.2
Green	Alistair Morten	114	5.5	+1.1
Majority		831	40.1	
Turnout		2,073	28.9	−1.1
Tattenham RA hold		Swing		
