= Reigate Tunnel =

Pedestrian tunnel in Surrey, England

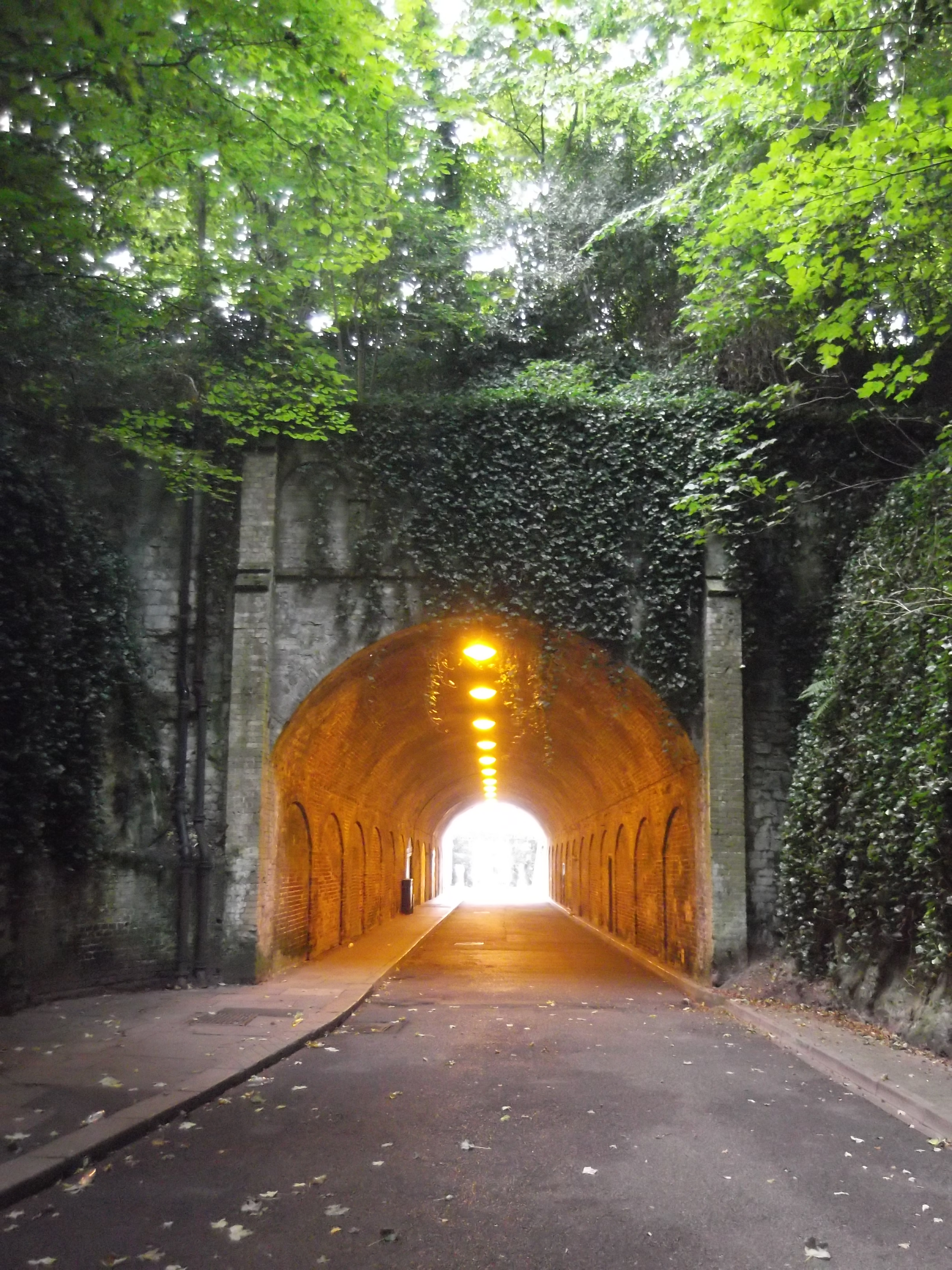
- Reigate Tunnel from the north
- Interactive map of Reigate Tunnel

Overview
- Location: Reigate, Surrey, England
- Coordinates: 51.238°N 0.206°W
- Status: open

Operation
- Constructed: 1823
- Opened: 1824
- Traffic: Pedestrian

Technical
- Design engineer: William Constable
- Length: 51 m (56 yd)

Reigate Tunnel is a former road tunnel in Reigate, Surrey, England. It runs under the hill that was once the site of Reigate Castle and was built during 1823, although some sources report that it only opened in 1824. The narrow and short tunnel formerly carried the A217 road, and is now pedestrianised. It is grade II listed.

== History ==
The tunnel was designed by William Constable, the surveyor for the Reigate Turnpike Trust. It is 51 m (56 yd) long and runs through the Folkestone Beds beneath Reigate Castle. It provides a direct link between the High Street (to the south) and London Road (to the north), reducing the distance between the two by 0.25 mi (0.4 km).

Construction began in 1823 and required the demolition of two shops on the north side of the High Street. The two portals were built with bricks made from the local Gault clay and the tunnel is lined with red brick in a stretcher bond. The work was funded by John Cocks, 1st Earl Somers, through whose land it ran, and was completed in the summer of 1824. A toll post was erected at the southern entrance and tolls were levied for horses and horse-drawn vehicles. Pedestrians were not charged for using the tunnel.

Tolls in 1824
Vehicle type	Toll
Coach with four horses	6d
Coach with two horses	3d
Chaise with one horse	1 1/2d
One horse	1/2d
Pedestrian	no charge

The tolls were removed in 1858. In 1954, the tunnel was closed to southbound motor traffic and was fully pedestrianised in April 1970. It was Grade II listed on 27 January 1989. A plaque above the southern entrance gives the year of construction as 1823.
