= Old Town Hall, Reigate =

Municipal building in Reigate, Surrey, England

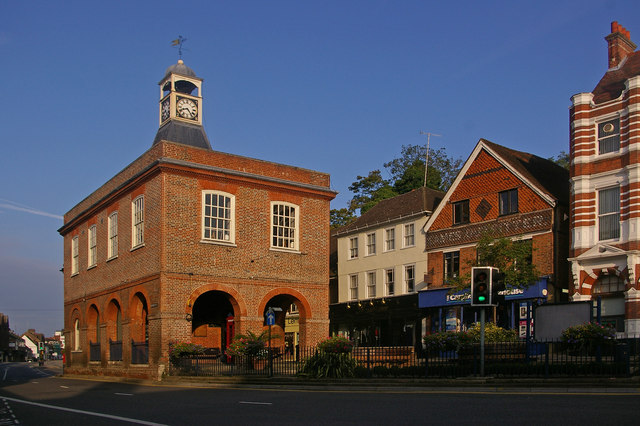
- Old Town Hall, Reigate

- Shown in Surrey
- 51.2377°N 0.2063°W
- Location: High Street, Reigate

History
- Built: 1728

Site notes
- Architectural style: Neoclassical style

Listed Building – Grade II*
- Official name: The Old Town Hall (including the K6 Telephone Kiosk on the East Side of the Old Town Hall, High Street)
- Designated: 19 October 1951
- Reference no.: 1188608

Listed Building – Grade II
- Official name: K6 Telephone Kiosk on West Side of Old Town Hall, High Street
- Designated: 17 November 1987
- Reference no.: 1029046

The Old Town Hall is a municipal building in the High Street, Reigate, Surrey, England. It is a Grade II* listed building.

== History ==
The site on the north side of the High Street was previously occupied by the 13th chapel and hospice of St. Thomas of Canterbury. Although the chapel was not on the Pilgrims' Way, it formed a place where pilgrims might rest on their journey from Winchester to Canterbury.

The old town hall was designed in the neoclassical style and completed in 1728. The design involved arcading on the ground floor to allow markets to be held; an assembly room with segmental headed sash windows was established on the first floor. The east elevation of the building was vertical but the west elevation of the building was curved. In 1811, a roof lantern with, a clock, a bell and weather vane was removed from the tower of the adjacent prison building, which was itself then demolished, and installed on the roof of the old town hall. As well as accommodating the local horse-drawn fire engine and the local police station, the building was used as a courthouse for petty sessions in the 19th century.

The building served as the headquarters of Reigate Municipal Borough Council from its formation in 1863 until the borough council moved to the new town hall in Castlefield Road in 1901. Following the death of Lady Henry Somerset of Reigate Priory, the old town hall formed part of the estate which was acquired by a local benefactor, Randel Vogan, and donated to the borough council in 1922.

In the 1930s, two K6 red telephone boxes of the type designed by Sir Giles Gilbert Scott were installed at the old town hall, one at the east end and the other in the covered area at the west end.

Following the restoration of the building, the ground floor of the old town hall re-opened as a Caffè Nero outlet in February 2008.
