= Salfords and Sidlow =

Civil parish in Surrey, England

Coordinates: 51.200°N 0.185°W

Salfords and Sidlow is a civil parish in the Reigate and Banstead borough of Surrey, England. It has a population of 3,069. The parish includes the villages of Salfords and Sidlow.

The parish was created in 1974 following the Local Government Act 1972 from the parts of the parishes of Horley and Charlwood that were not proposed to be transferred to the Crawley district of West Sussex. The new parish was proposed to be part of the Mole Valley district, along with the rest of the Dorking and Horley Rural District. In a late change to the proposals the government passed the Charlwood and Horley Act 1974, which received royal assent less than two months before the changes were due to come into force. The revised proposals saw only the parts of Horley and Charlwood containing Gatwick Airport transferred to Crawley, leaving the rest of Charlwood and Horley in Surrey after all. The parts of the legislation creating the new parish of Salfords and Sidlow were not revoked, but the new parish was placed instead in Reigate and Banstead, as was Horley, rather than in Mole Valley.

== Demography and housing ==
2011 Census Homes
| Output area | Detached | Semi-detached | Terraced | Flats and apartments | Caravans/temporary/mobile homes | shared between households |
|---|---|---|---|---|---|---|
| (Civil Parish) | 496 | 556 | 73 | 101 | 72 | 1 |

The average level of accommodation in the region composed of detached houses was 28%, the average that was apartments was 22.6%.

2011 Census Key Statistics
| Output area | Population | Households | % Owned outright | % Owned with a loan | hectares |
|---|---|---|---|---|---|
| (Civil Parish) | 3,185 | 1,299 | 43.0% | 41.8% | 1875 |

The proportion of households in the civil parish who owned their home outright compares to the regional average of 35.1%. The proportion who owned their home with a loan compares to the regional average of 32.5%. The remaining % is made up of rented dwellings (plus a negligible % of households living rent-free).
