= 2011 Reigate and Banstead Borough Council election =

Local election in Surrey, UK

Results of the 2011 Reigate and Banstead Borough Council election

Elections to Reigate and Banstead Borough Council were held on 5 May 2011, alongside other local elections across the United Kingdom. 17 seats (one third) of the council were up for election. Following the election the council remained under Conservative control.

== Results summary ==
2011 Reigate and Banstead Borough Council election
Party	Seats Before	Change	Seats After
Conservative Party	39	▼1	38
Liberal Democrats	3	Steady	3
Green Party	1	▲1	2
Labour Party	1	▼1	0
Others	7	▲1	8

== See also ==
- Reigate and Banstead Borough Council elections
