= Reigate Castle =

Former castle in Reigate, Surrey, England

Coordinates: 51°13′48″N 0°11′16″W

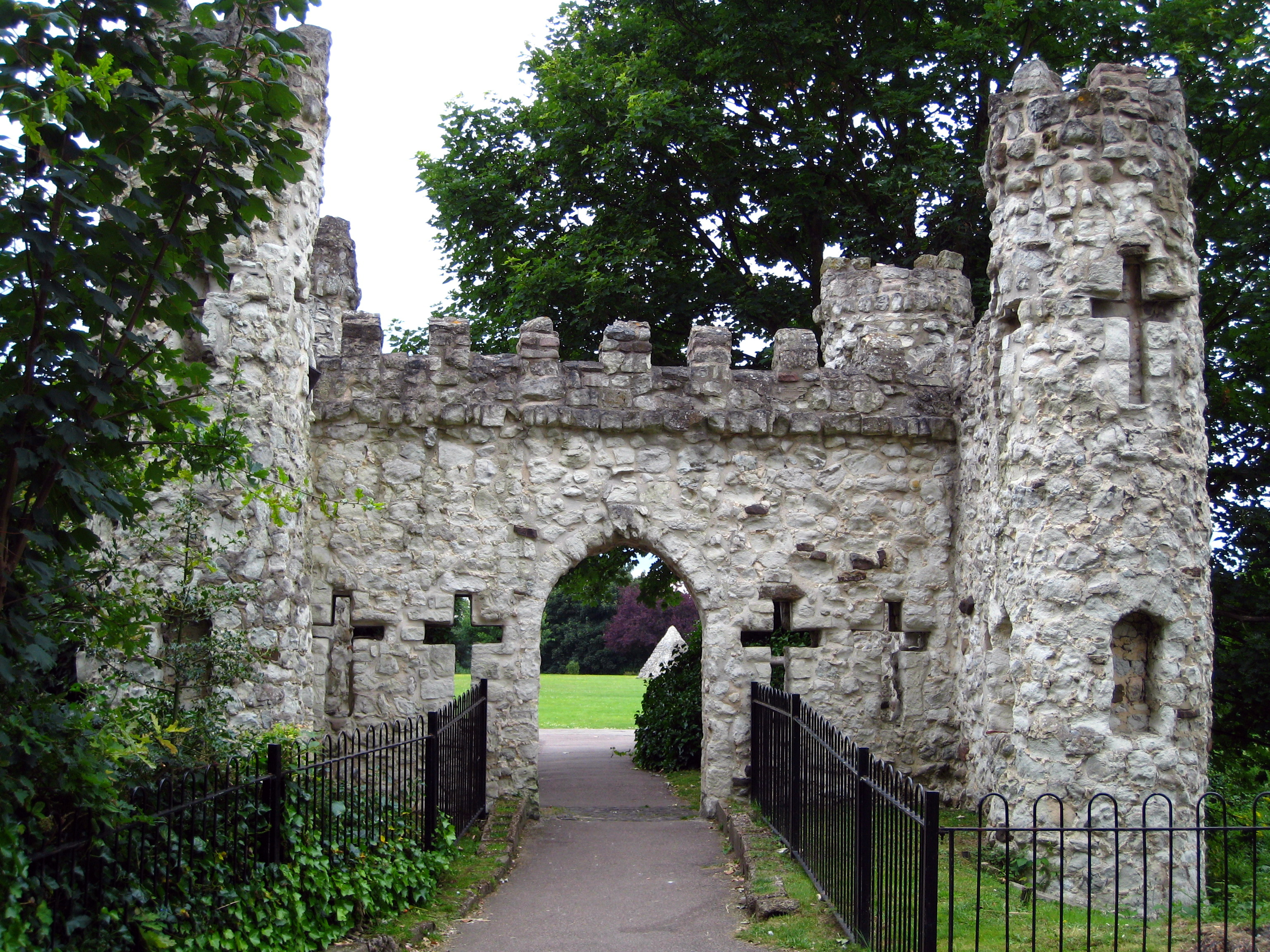

Reigate Castle is a former castle in the town of Reigate in the county of Surrey, England. None of the castle buildings survive today, but a cave below the site, considered to be part of the castle, still exists. Known as "Baron's Cave", it is occasionally open to the public for tours.

The site of the castle is known as "Castle Grounds", and is a public park. At its entrance stands a folly, built in the 18th century, in the form a medieval castle gateway.

== History ==
William the Conqueror granted the land around Reigate to one of his supporters, William de Warenne, who was created Earl of Surrey in 1088. It is believed that his son, William de Warenne, 2nd Earl of Surrey, ordered that Reigate Castle be built, although the de Warennes had their southern base in Lewes, Sussex, as well as castles in Yorkshire and Normandy. Around 1150 the de Warennes ordered that a town be constructed below the castle. This town forms the basis of modern-day Reigate. The origin of the name Reigate is uncertain, but appears to derive from Roe-deer Gate, as the town was situated near to the entrance to the de Warenne's deer park. Another possibility is that Reigate derives from Rhie-gat, roughly translating to the River's Course.

In 1216 the castle was one of many captured by the French in southern England, including Chichester Castle. In 1347 the castle became the property of the FitzAlan family, Earls of Arundel. From 1397 it was owned by a number of Lords of the Manor of Reigate, including the influential Howard family. It was occupied until the 16th century, but fell into disrepair afterwards. It was demolished in 1648 after occupation as a garrison during the Civil War by followers of a Royalist uprising.

In 1777 a mock medieval gateway was built over the ruins of the original castle. An inscription is written on the side of the gateway, in English on one side and Latin on the other:

To save the memory of William Earl Warren who in old days dwelt here and was a loyal champion of our liberties from perishing like his own castle by the ravages of time, Richard Barnes at his own expense erected this gateway in the year 1777.

ne willi comitis warren veteris hujusce loci incolae fidique libertatum nostrarum vindicis memoria temporum injuria cum ipso castello intercideret propriis R. B. impensis H.P.E anno MDCCLXXVII.

None of the original castle buildings have survived, with the exception of the Barons' Cave. Little more is known of the castle which has never been excavated on any great scale. Local legend says prior to the signing of Magna Carta, the rebellious barons met to hammer out the details of the document in the extensive caves below the castle.

== Modern day ==
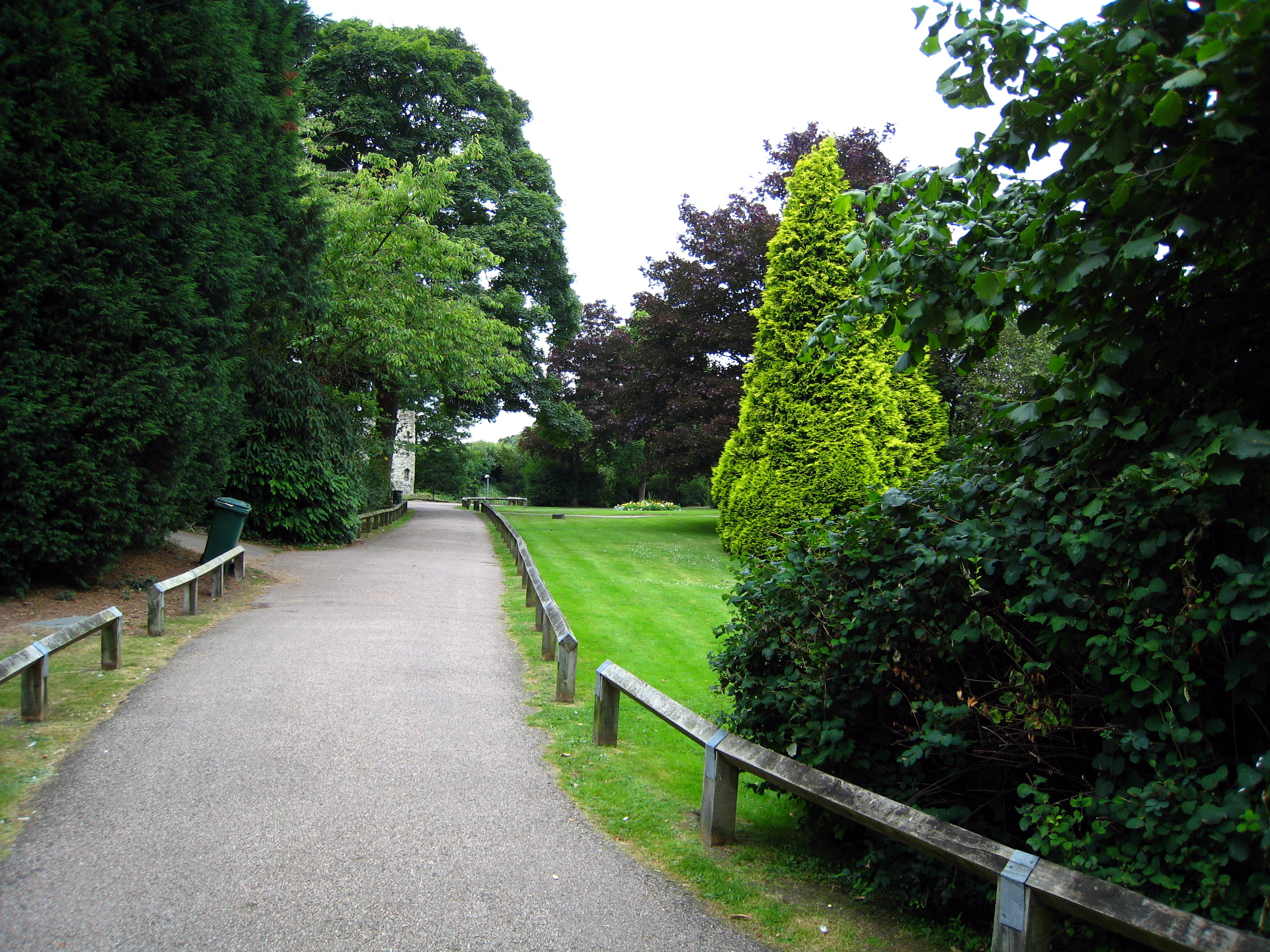

The Reigate Castle Tunnel runs under the grounds of Reigate Castle and was constructed in 1823. It is believed to be Europe's first road tunnel and is pedestrianised.

The castle grounds remain as public gardens.

The castle gate is the main feature of Reigate and Banstead's municipal coat of arms.

=== Caves ===
Tours of the Baron's and Tunnel Road Caves take place on the second Saturday of every month between May and September inclusive.
