= Sidlow =

Coordinates: 51°12′29″N 0°11′56″W

- Village
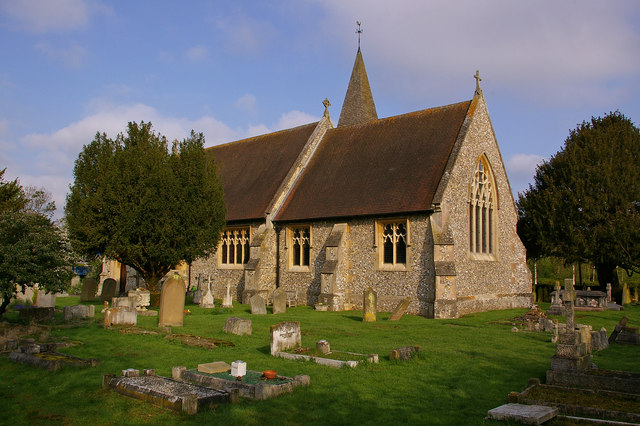
- Emmanuel Church

- Location within Surrey
- Area: 11.93 km^{2} (4.61 sq mi)
- Population: 636 (2011 census)
  - Density: 53/km^{2} (140/sq mi)
- OS grid reference: TQ259470
- Civil parish: Salfords and Sidlow
- District: Reigate and Banstead
- Shire county: Surrey
- Region: South East
- Country: England
- Sovereign state: United Kingdom
- Post town: REIGATE
- Postcode district: RH2
- Dialling code: 01737
- Police: Surrey
- Fire: Surrey
- Ambulance: South East Coast
- UK Parliament: Reigate

Sidlow is a mainly rural, lightly populated village in the parish of Salfords and Sidlow, in the south of the borough of Reigate and Banstead in Surrey, England.

== Geography and sublocalities ==
Sidlow is the west of the civil parish; a high proportion of its land is taken up by farms; no motorways or railways bisect this part of the parish instead the area has three small tributaries' confluences with the upper River Mole. Urban to suburban development is residential and concentred into a linear settlement along a lane west of a road junction with the north-south A217 road which has the Anglican church opposite. Beyond this the road forms a crescent which briefly becomes urban again at the Ironsbottom neighbourhood, a sub-settlement.

Two lines of further development are towards the crescent return of the lane named Ironsbottom at Wrays and south along the A217 at Crutchfield. The A217 direct, traffic light-controlled route between the economic centres of Reigate and Gatwick Airport is bypassed for long-distance traffic by the M23 motorway 3 miles (4.8 km) east.

Less than five percent of the land of Sidlow is at flood risk, in built terms, restricted to homes opposite the church of Sidlow Bridge and the church itself.

== Church ==
Sidlow has a Church of England church, the Emmanuel Church at Sidlow Bridge, dating to 1861. The church was designed by Henry Clutton with stained glass by Henry Holiday. It is in the medieval-founded Diocese of Southwark. The lych gate to the church was erected in 1921 as a memorial to the village's war dead from the Great War. It is Grade II listed.

== Duxhurst Industrial Farm Colony ==
Duxhurst Industrial Farm Colony, a voluntary in-patient residential treatment center for the treatment and cure of habitual alcoholic women was founded in 1895 at Duxhurst, about 4 miles (6.4 km) from Reigate railway station, by Lady Henry Somerset. The 180 acres (73 ha) farm contained home-like cottages, a church, the chaplain's lodge, farm buildings, a hospital, and a large dining and recreation hall.
