= Salfords =

Village in Surrey, England

Coordinates: 51.2014°N 0.1683°W

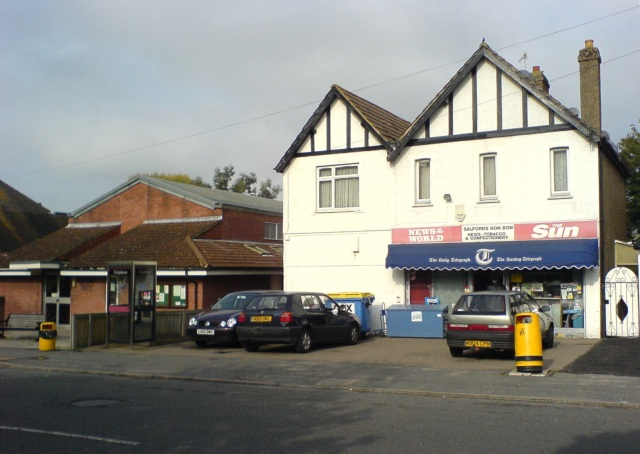
- Community Centre, phone box and newsagent

- Location within Surrey
- Population: Approx. 1900 (2001)
- OS grid reference: TQ279463
  - London: 21 miles (34 km)
- Civil parish: Salfords and Sidlow
- District: Reigate and Banstead
- Shire county: Surrey
- Region: South East
- Country: England
- Sovereign state: United Kingdom
- Post town: Redhill
- Postcode district: RH1
- Dialling code: 01293; 01737
- Police: Surrey
- Fire: Surrey
- Ambulance: South East Coast
- UK Parliament: Dorking and Horley

Salfords /ˈsælfʊdz/ SAL-fudz) is a village in the borough of Reigate and Banstead in Surrey, England. It lies approximately 3 miles (4.8 km) south of Redhill on the A23 London to Brighton road. The village is within the civil parish of Salfords and Sidlow which covers a population of 3,069, and has a parish council.

== Toponymy ==
The earliest written record of the village is from the assizes roll of 1279, in which a "Stephen de Salford" is mentioned as a resident. It appears in later documents as Salfordebrugg (1316), Saleford (1355) and Sallforde (1535). The first part is thought to derive from the Old English sealh, meaning willow, and the name is generally agreed to mean "ford by the willow tree(s)".

== Description ==
The village has its own 20th century church, Christ The King, primary school, cricket club, some shops, cafes, a social club, a tanning salon, a number of restaurants and a take away. Salfords Stream runs through the village and can cause flooding in the autumn and winter months. The southern boundary is marked by the Burstow stream. Both are minor River Mole tributaries, itself a tributary of the River Thames. The only buildings old enough to be listed structures in the village are two adjoining houses on Brighton Road and The Mill House Hotel on the Salfords Stream.

The village once boasted a wooden watermill with two sluice gates next to the Mill House Hotel. It produced breakfast cereals in the early twentieth century. By the 1950s it was defunct and has since been dismantled and partly washed away.

Salfords made the national news in January 2008 when a farmer named Robert Fidler built a personal home at Honeycrock Farm similar in style to a Tudor castle and disguised it with hay bales and tarpaulin for four years in an attempt to avoid planning permission from Reigate and Banstead Borough Council.

Surrey Police opened a 24-cell custody suite at the IO centre on Salbrook Road in 2013, replacing an existing 12-cell facility at Reigate. The force had originally intended to build a 30-cell suite in Salfords, but reduced the scale of the development after the initial planning application was declined by the borough council.

== History ==
Until the 1970s Salfords was part of Horley and with its own Victorian Chapel Church, owing its existence to the construction of the A23 road. A Saxon trackway ran from Earlswood to Horley midway between the London to Brighton railway and the modern main road. It then ran in front of the former Monotype Corporation site towards the Horley gasometer, passed the moated Thunderfield Castle (a 13th-century manor) on 'Harolds Lea' and reached the south coast near Brighton.

In the 1870s a state school was built on the fork between the London Road and Woodhatch Road on Petridge Common. The school consisted of four classrooms three were divided by sliding glass doors. The head teacher was located upstairs above the cloakrooms. In World War II two air raid shelters were built on opposite sides of the long tapering playground. In the mid-1950s the then "Salfords County Primary School" started to expand and relocated to Copsleigh Avenue.

The railway station was built in 1915 to enable workers access to the Monotype Corporation factory. Today it is served by Thameslink services between Bedford and Three Bridges with additional services in the peak hours between London Victoria and Gatwick Airport. On the main road Hall & Co, the dominant building materials supplier in the south east of England had their regional maintenance depot, used in WWII to repair war tanks.

== Cricket club ==
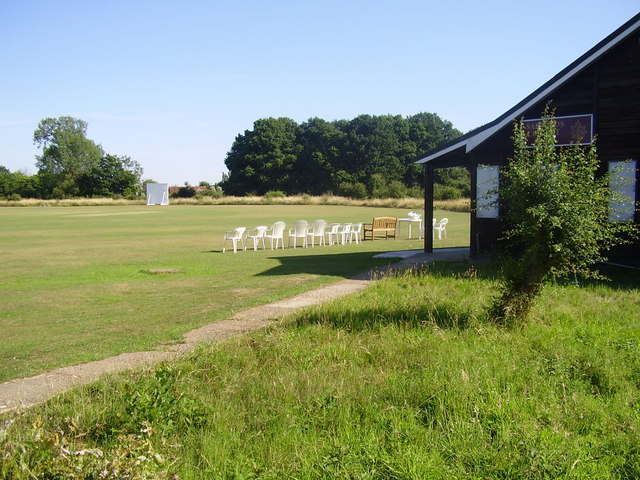
Salfords Cricket Club

Salfords Cricket Club is a village cricket club. The club runs two Saturday League sides in the Surrey Downs League and a Sunday friendly side. The club host a "Cricket Week" of mid-week games each July, and a tour every August. The club now play on a council-owned ground on Petridge Wood Common, off Woodhatch Road. Salfords Cricket Club was formed in 1921. The Club's first captain was Tom Enever, whose photograph can be seen in the pavilion today. The Council relocated the club to its present ground at Petridge Wood Common in 1960.

== See also ==
- List of places of worship in Reigate and Banstead
