= 2024 Reigate and Banstead Borough Council election =

Local election in Reigate, England

- 2 May 2024

16 out of 45 seats to Reigate and Banstead Borough Council 23 seats needed for a majority

	First party	Second party	Third party
Leader	Richard Biggs	Jonathan Essex	Nick Harrison
Party	Conservative	Green	Residents
Last election	23 seats, 37.8%	11 seats, 23.2%	6 seats, 7.3%
Seats before	22	11	5
Seats won	4	5	3
Seats after	18	13	6
Seat change	▼5	▲2	Steady
Popular vote	11,838	9,443	2,969
Percentage	31.3%	25.0%	7.8%
Swing	▼6.5%	▲1.8%	▲0.5%
	Fourth party	Fifth party	Sixth party
Leader	Stephen Kulka
Party	Liberal Democrats	Independent	Labour
Last election	3 seats, 14.4%	1 seat, 0.0%	1 seat, 16.9%
Seats before	3	2	1
Seats won	2	1	1
Seats after	4	2	2
Seat change	▲1	▲1	▲1
Popular vote	5,572	1,135	6,450
Percentage	14.7%	3.0%	17.0%
Swing	▲0.3%	▲3.0%	▲0.1%
- Winner of each seat at the 2024 Reigate and Banstead Borough Council election
Leader before election
Richard Biggs
Conservative
No overall control
Leader after election
Richard Biggs
Conservative
No overall control

The 2024 Reigate and Banstead Borough Council election took place on 2 May 2024 to elect members of Reigate and Banstead Borough Council in Surrey, England. This was on the same day as other local elections.

The council remained under no overall control following the election.

== Background ==
The Conservatives had held a one seat majority on the council until March 2024, when it went under no overall control due to Conservative councillor Zelanie Cooper leaving the party.

== Summary ==
The council remained under no overall control after the election. The Conservatives made further losses, but remained the largest party on the council. They continued to run the council as a minority administration after the election.

=== Election result ===
2024 Reigate and Banstead Borough Council election
Party	This election				Full council			This election		
Party	Candidates	Seats	Net	Seats %	Other	Total	Total %	Votes	Votes %	+/−
Conservative	{{{candidates}}}	4	▼5	25.0	14	18	40.0	11,838	31.3	–6.5
Green	{{{candidates}}}	5	▲2	31.3	8	13	28.9	9,443	25.0	+1.8
Residents	{{{candidates}}}	3	Steady	18.8	3	6	13.3	2,969	7.8	+0.5
Liberal Democrats	{{{candidates}}}	2	▲1	12.5	2	4	8.9	5,572	14.7	+0.3
Labour	{{{candidates}}}	1	▲1	6.3	1	2	4.4	6,450	17.0	+0.1
Independent	{{{candidates}}}	1	▲1	6.3	1	2	4.4	1,135	3.0	+3.0
Reform	{{{candidates}}}	0	Steady	0.0	0	0	0.0	433	1.1	+0.6

=== Incumbents ===
Incumbent councillors
Ward	Councillor	Party
Banstead Village Ward	Nadean Moses	Conservative
Chipstead, Kingswood and Woodmansterne	Caroline Neame	Conservative
Earlswood and Whitebushes	Joseph Booton	Green
Hooley, Merstham and Netherne	Frank Kelly	Conservative
Horley Central and South	Christian Stevens	Conservative
Horley East and Salfords	Andrew King	Conservative
Horley West and Sidlow	Giorgio Buttironi	Conservative
Lower Kingswood, Tadworth and Walton	Zelanie Cooper	Independent
Meadvale and St Johns	Martin Elbourne	Liberal Democrats
Nork	Peter Harp	Residents
Redhill East	Sue Sinden	Green
Redhill West and Wray Common	Kanika Sachdeva	Conservative
Reigate	Michael Blacker	Conservative
South Park and Woodhatch	Paul Chandler	Green
Tattenham Corner and Preston	Bob Harper	Residents

== Ward results ==
The Statement of Persons Nominated, which details the candidates standing in each ward, was released by Reigate and Banstead Borough Council following the close of nominations on 5 April 2024. Sitting councillors standing for re-election are marked with an asterisk (*).

=== Banstead Village ===
Banstead Village
Party	Candidate	Votes	%	±%
Conservative	Nadean Moses*	1,354	60.6	−1.8
Labour	Chris Salmen	417	18.6	+3.0
Liberal Democrats	Anthony Anderson	231	10.3	−2.4
Green	Chris Hanson-Granville	230	10.3	+1.0
Majority		1,123	42.0	−4.8
Turnout		2,257	34	
Registered electors				
Conservative hold		Swing		

=== Chipstead, Kingswood & Woodmansterne ===
Chipstead, Kingswood & Woodmansterne
Party	Candidate	Votes	%	±%
Conservative	Shelly Newton	1,671	65.0	+2.2
Labour	Tony Robinson	333	13.0	+0.8
Liberal Democrats	Mark Johnston	320	12.5	+0.5
Green	Christian Oster	245	9.5	−3.6
Majority		1,338	52.0	
Turnout		2,590	35	
Registered electors				
Conservative hold		Swing		

=== Earlswood & Whitebushes ===
Earlswood & Whitebushes
Party	Candidate	Votes	%	±%
Green	Gillian Vischer	1,429	60.4	+2.0
Conservative	Trevor Nugent	417	17.6	−4.2
Labour	Alistair Wells	345	14.6	+0.1
Liberal Democrats	Lexi Lawrence	176	7.4	+2.1
Majority		1,012	42.8	
Turnout		2,381	34	
Registered electors				
Green hold		Swing		

=== Hooley, Merstham & Netherne ===
Hooley, Merstham & Netherne
Party	Candidate	Votes	%	±%
Green	Joel Gabriel	1,011	38.4	+1.0
Conservative	Frank Kelly*	635	24.1	−4.8
Labour	Catherine Barrett	533	20.2	−2.9
Reform	Chris Scott	284	10.8	N/A
Liberal Democrats	Stuart Holmes	173	6.6	−4.0
Majority		376	14.3	
Turnout		2,650	33	
Registered electors				
Green gain from Conservative		Swing		

=== Horley Central & South ===
Horley Central & South
Party	Candidate	Votes	%	±%
Conservative	Giorgio Buttironi*	781	33.3	−6.6
Green	Steel Horton	595	25.4	+12.7
Labour	Lynnette Easterbrook	517	22.1	−4.5
Liberal Democrats	Sam Mearing	450	19.2	+6.6
Majority		186	7.9	
Turnout		2,367	32	
Registered electors				
Conservative hold		Swing		

=== Horley East & Salfords ===
Horley East & Salfords
Party	Candidate	Votes	%	±%
Green	Neha Boghani	1,090	42.9	+0.8
Conservative	Taylor O'Driscoll	867	34.1	−1.2
Labour	Ryan Ramsey	311	12.2	−1.6
Liberal Democrats	Peter Newton	272	10.7	+2.0
Majority		223	8.8	
Turnout		2,560	36	
Registered electors				
Green gain from Conservative		Swing		

=== Horley West & Sidlow ===
Horley West & Sidlow
Party	Candidate	Votes	%	±%
Liberal Democrats	Steve Wotton	1,083	40.2	+23.5
Conservative	Sujata Das	749	27.8	−12.2
Labour	Tom Turner	690	25.6	−7.6
Green	Neville Kemp	174	6.5	−3.6
Majority		334	12.4	
Turnout		2,720	32	
Registered electors				
Liberal Democrats gain from Conservative		Swing		

=== Lower Kingswood, Tadworth & Walton ===
Lower Kingswood, Tadworth & Walton
Party	Candidate	Votes	%	±%
Independent	Zelanie Cooper*	1,135	39.9	N/A
Conservative	Tim Peniston-Bird	1,038	36.5	−36.1
Labour	Faye Llewellyn	249	8.8	−8.7
Green	Alistair Morten	220	7.7	N/A
Liberal Democrats	Gregory Ardan	202	7.1	−12.8
Majority		97	3.4	
Turnout		2,856	37	
Registered electors				
Independent gain from Conservative		Swing		

Zelanie Cooper was originally elected as a Conservative, but left the party to sit as an independent prior to election.

=== Meadvale & St. John's ===
Meadvale & St. John's
Party	Candidate	Votes	%	±%
Liberal Democrats	Martin Elbourne*	970	36.6	−8.4
Conservative	Jonathan White	765	28.9	+1.4
Green	Natasha Hobbs	481	18.2	+1.3
Labour	Rosie Norgrove	431	16.3	+5.7
Majority		205	7.7	
Turnout		2,663	40	
Registered electors				
Liberal Democrats hold		Swing		

=== Nork ===
Nork
Party	Candidate	Votes	%	±%
Residents	Peter Harp*	1,591	65.4	+8.6
Conservative	Pamela Freeman	453	18.6	−7.4
Labour	Geoffrey Woodhead	200	8.2	+0.1
Green	Flip Bakker	120	4.9	−1.0
Liberal Democrats	Isobel Squire	69	2.8	−0.4
Majority		1,138	46.8	
Turnout		2,438	34	
Registered electors				
Residents hold		Swing		

=== Redhill East ===
Redhill East
Party	Candidate	Votes	%	±%
Green	Sue Sinden*	1,439	62.8	−8.2
Labour	Elliott Wragg	370	16.2	+6.0
Conservative	Joan Odiachi	367	16.0	+1.7
Liberal Democrats	Moray Carey	115	5.0	+0.6
Majority		1,069	46.6	
Turnout		2,314	36	
Registered electors				
Green hold		Swing		

=== Redhill West & Wray Common ===
Redhill West & Wray Common
Party	Candidate	Votes	%	±%
Labour	Jenny Orchard	1,067	41.1	+5.3
Conservative	Mark Mendoza	808	31.1	−3.5
Green	Felix Kennedy	449	17.3	+2.2
Liberal Democrats	Gemma Roulston	271	10.4	−4.1
Majority		259	12.0	
Turnout		2,618	36	
Registered electors				
Labour gain from Conservative		Swing		

=== Reigate ===
Reigate
Party	Candidate	Votes	%	±%
Conservative	Michael Blacker*	1,090	36.1	−8.1
Liberal Democrats	Jemma de Vincenzo	1,007	33.3	+3.1
Green	Toby Risk	668	22.1	+6.4
Labour	Mark Scott	258	8.5	−1.4
Majority		83	2.8	
Turnout		3,054	41	
Registered electors				
Conservative hold		Swing		

=== South Park & Woodhatch ===
South Park & Woodhatch
Party	Candidate	Votes	%	±%
Green	Paul Chandler*	1,185	50.6	+10.9
Conservative	Christian Stevens	486	20.8	−25.3
Labour	Liam Castles	414	17.7	+8.6
Reform	Joseph Fox	149	6.4	N/A
Liberal Democrats	Robin Lawrence	107	4.6	−0.5
Majority		699	29.8	
Turnout		2,345	36	
Registered electors				
Green hold		Swing		

(Christian Stevens was the Councillor for Horley Central and South whose term came to an end in 2024.)

=== Tattenham Corner & Preston ===
Tattenham Corner & Preston (2 seats due to by-election)
Party	Candidate	Votes	%	±%
Residents	Tim Snuggs	1,378	62.7	−0.7
Residents	Barry Nash	1,318	60.0	−3.4
Conservative	Adrian Freeman	357	16.2	+1.3
Labour	Rex Giles	315	14.3	−0.2
Labour	Ian Thirlwall	226	10.3	−4.2
Conservative	Rajan Mathew	225	10.2	−4.7
Liberal Democrats	Graham Burr	126	5.7	+2.1
Liberal Democrats	Mike Robinson	108	4.9	+1.3
Green	Robert Pye	107	4.9	+1.4
Majority		961	43.8	
Turnout		2,213	30	
Registered electors				
Residents hold				
Residents hold				

== By-elections ==
=== Meadvale & St Johns ===
Meadvale & St Johns by-election: 16 October 2025
Party	Candidate	Votes	%	±%
Liberal Democrats	Mark Johnston	1,009	48.3	+11.7
Green	Natasha Lawrence	368	17.6	+0.6
Conservative	Will de Save	251	12.0	−16.9
Reform	Marcus Harriott	242	11.6	N/A
Independent	Jonathan White	218	10.4	N/A
Majority		641	30.7	+23.0
Turnout		2,092		
Liberal Democrats hold		Swing	▲6.2	

=== Earlswood & Whitebushes ===
Earlswood & Whitebushes by-election: 7 May 2026
Party	Candidate	Votes	%	±%
Green	Robin Whitwell	1,587	48.3	−12.1
Reform	Joseph Fox	715	21.8	N/A
Conservative	Brian O'Neill	514	15.6	−2.0
Liberal Democrats	Chris Kelly	246	7.5	+0.1
Labour	Elliott Wragg	223	6.8	−7.8
Majority		872	26.5	−16.3
Turnout		3,285	45.8	+11.8
Registered electors		7,166		
Green hold				

=== Hooley, Merstham & Netherne ===
Hooley, Merstham & Netherne by-election: 6 August 2026 Death of Mus Tary (Conservative)
Party	Candidate	Votes	%	±%
Green	Nick Abear	934	41.8	+3.4
Reform	Johnny Wolf	545	24.4	+14.0
Conservative	Jon Mears	454	20.4	−3.7
Liberal Democrats	Tina Cohen	166	7.5	+0.9
Labour	Catherine Barrett	138	6.2	−14.0
Majority		389	17.5	+3.2
Turnout		2,242	27.2	−5.8
Registered electors		8,244		
Green gain from Conservative		Swing	▼5.3	
