= Hooley =

Village in Surrey, England

Coordinates: 51.293°N 0.164°W

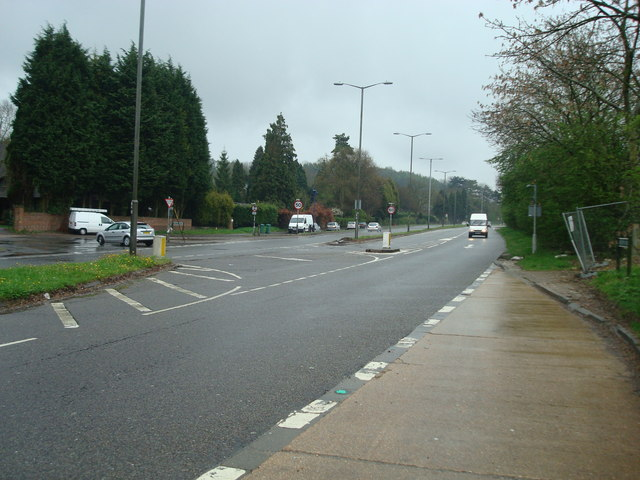
- Rural part of the Brighton Road (A23) in Hooley

- Location within Surrey
- Area: 1.0 km^{2} (0.39 sq mi)
- Population: 1,203
  - Density: 1,203/km^{2} (3,120/sq mi)
- OS grid reference: TQ287564
- District: Reigate and Banstead
- Shire county: Surrey
- Region: South East
- Country: England
- Sovereign state: United Kingdom
- Post town: Coulsdon
- Postcode district: CR5
- Dialling code: 01737
- Police: Surrey
- Fire: Surrey
- Ambulance: South East Coast
- UK Parliament: East Surrey

Hooley is a village in the borough of Reigate and Banstead in Surrey, England. Within its small grid of streets is the 13th-century church of Chipstead which has been, since time immemorial, its ecclesiastical parish. Hooley is connected via paths and the A23 road to the larger community of Coulsdon, to the north, in the London Borough of Croydon.

== History ==
Hooley until the early 20th century was a sparsely inhabited hamlet of Chipstead, both a largely permeable chalk upland area with little housing or industry. Both the London, Brighton and South Coast Railway and the South Eastern Railway recognised the construction of short tunnels here as the best route out of London to Brighton for their rival railway lines. The two very deep railway cuttings here have been the locations of many land slips over the years. Before these the 1805 extension of the Surrey Iron Railway, a horse-drawn plateway came through this pass. A bridge from this early plateway survives at the junction of Brighton Road with Dean Lane. In 1965, upon the formation of Greater London, Hooley, along with Purley and Coulsdon, became part of the London Borough of Croydon. Some communities on the very edge of Greater London were allowed the option of returning to their former counties. Hooley voted to return to Surrey and was added to Banstead. In the same way, Farleigh, which was also then in Croydon, voted to leave and was added to Godstone.
