= Reigate and Banstead =

Coordinates: 51.249°N 0.160°W

Borough of Reigate and Banstead
- Borough and non-metropolitan district
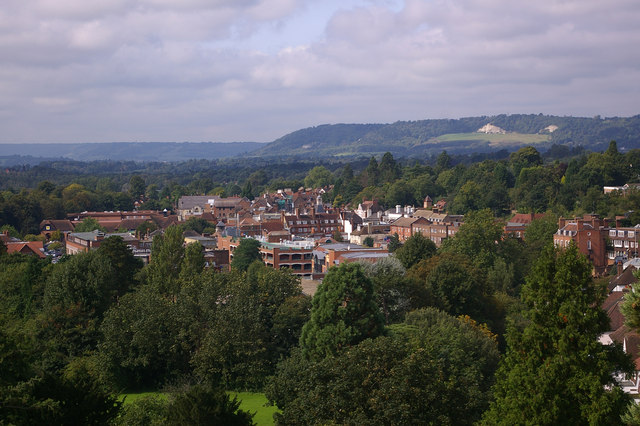
- View over Reigate towards the North Downs
- Motto: Never Wonne Ne Never Shall
- Reigate and Banstead shown within Surrey
- Sovereign state: United Kingdom
- Constituent country: England
- Region: South East England
- Non-metropolitan county: Surrey
- Status: Non-metropolitan district
- Admin HQ: Reigate
- Incorporated: 1 April 1974

Government
  - Type: Non-metropolitan district council
  - Body: Reigate and Banstead Borough Council
  - MPs: Chris Coghlan; Claire Coutinho; Rebecca Paul

Area
  - Total: 49.8 sq mi (129.1 km^{2})
  - Rank: 177th (of 296) Highest point : Reigate Hill

Population (2025)
  - Total: 159,413
  - Rank: 141st (of 296)
  - Density: 3,198/sq mi (1,235/km^{2})

Ethnicity (2021)
  - Ethnic groups: List: 84.4% White; 7.5% Asian; 3.7% Mixed; 2.9% Black; 1.4% other

Religion (2021)
  - Religion: List: 49.1% Christianity; 38.1% no religion; 6% not stated; 3.1% Islam; 2.4% Hinduism; 0.5% Buddhism; 0.4% other; 0.2% Judaism; 0.2% Sikhism
- Time zone: UTC0 (GMT)
  - Summer (DST): UTC+1 (BST)
- ONS code: 43UF (ONS); E07000211 (GSS)
- OS grid reference: TQ2840251646

Reigate and Banstead is a local government district with borough status in Surrey, England. Its council is based in Reigate and the borough also includes the towns of Banstead, Horley and Redhill. Parts of the borough are within the Surrey Hills, a designated Area of Outstanding Natural Beauty. Northern parts of the borough, including Banstead, lie inside the M25 motorway which encircles London.

The neighbouring districts are Tandridge, Crawley, Mole Valley, Epsom and Ewell, Sutton and Croydon, the latter two being London boroughs.

== History ==
The district was created on 1 April 1974 under the Local Government Act 1972, covering the whole of two former districts and part of a third, which were all abolished at the same time:

- Banstead Urban District
- Dorking and Horley Rural District (Horley and Salfords and Sidlow parishes only, rest went to Mole Valley except area of Gatwick Airport which went to Crawley)
- Reigate Municipal Borough (which included Redhill)

The new district was named Reigate and Banstead after two of the former districts.

The district was awarded borough status from its creation, allowing the chair of the council to take the title of mayor.

As part of upcoming structural changes to local government in England, the district will be abolished in April 2027 and the area will become part of the new unitary authority of East Surrey.

== Governance ==
Reigate and Banstead Borough Council

Type
- Type: Non-metropolitan district

Leadership
- Mayor: Nick Harrison, Conservative since 21 May 2026
- Leader: Richard Biggs, Conservative since 25 May 2023
- Managing Director: Mari Roberts-Wood since July 2020

Structure
- Seats: 45 councillors
- Graph of the party split among 45 seats.
- Political groups: Administration (16) Conservative (16) Other parties (28) Green (14) Liberal Democrats (4) Tattenham & Preston Residents (3) Nork Residents’ Association (3) Independent (4) Vacant (1) Vacant (1)

Elections
- Voting system: First past the post
- First election: 7 June 1973
- Last election: 2 May 2024
- Last election: To be abolished

Meeting place
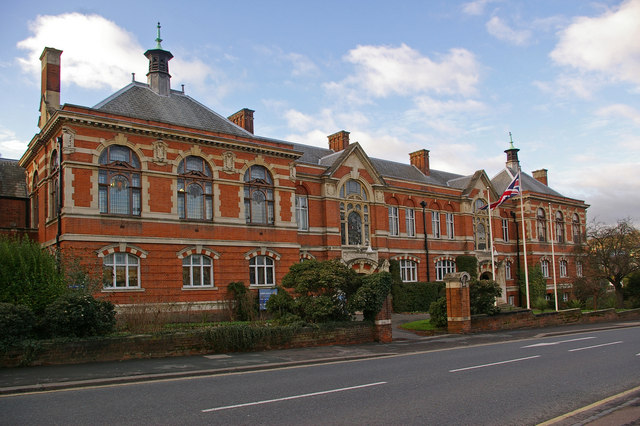
- Town Hall, Castlefield Road, Reigate, RH2 0SH

Website
- www.reigate-banstead.gov.uk

Reigate and Banstead Borough Council provides district-level services. County-level services are provided by Surrey County Council, which is also based in Reigate, having its headquarters at Woodhatch Place. In the south of the borough are two civil parishes at Horley and Salfords and Sidlow, which form a third tier of local government for their areas.

=== Political control ===
The council has been under no overall control since March 2024, being led by a Conservative minority administration.

The first elections to the council were held in 1973, initially operating as a shadow authority alongside the outgoing authorities until the new arrangements came into effect on 1 April 1974. Political control of the council since 1974 has been as follows:

Party in control	Years
Conservative	1974–1991
No overall control	1991–2000
Conservative	2000–2024
No overall control	2024–present

=== Leadership ===
The role of mayor is largely ceremonial in Reigate and Banstead. Political leadership is instead provided by the leader of the council. The leaders since 2003 have been:

Councillor	Party	From	To
Joan Spiers	Conservative	2003	17 May 2007
Lynne Hack	Conservative	17 May 2007	15 May 2008
Joan Spiers	Conservative	15 May 2008	Jun 2014
Vic Broad	Conservative	12 Jun 2014	24 May 2018
Mark Brunt	Conservative	24 May 2018	May 2023
Richard Biggs	Conservative	25 May 2023	

=== Composition ===
Following the 2024 election, and subsequent changes up to July 2026, the composition of the council was:

Party	Councillors
Conservative	16
Green	14
Liberal Democrats	4
Nork Residents' Association	3
Tattenham Corner and Preston Residents' Association	3
Independent	4
Vacant	1
Total	45

The two residents' associations and one of the independent councillors sit together as a group.

=== Elections ===
Since the last boundary changes in 2019 the council has comprised 45 councillors representing 15 wards, with each ward electing three councillors. Elections were held three years out of every four, with a third of the council (one councillor for each ward) being elected each time for a four-year term of office. Surrey County Council elections were held in the fourth year of the cycle when there were no borough council elections.

Further borough council elections were cancelled in 2026, and an election for the new East Surrey Council was held instead. East Surrey Council will formally come into being and take over local government functions in the area on 1 April 2027, at which point Reigate and Banstead Borough Council and the borough of Reigate and Banstead will be abolished.

=== Premises ===
The council is based at Reigate Town Hall on Castlefield Road, which had been completed in 1901 for the old Reigate Borough Council.

== Geography ==
The northern third of the borough is on the North Downs or its upper slopes. Commanding viewpoints exist in several locations in this area with the southern aspects of Colley Hill and Reigate Hill noteworthy enough to have had a major memorial and a picnic area with large café respectively. Historically much of this third was named Walton Heath and Banstead Heath.

The softer Greensand Ridge which is parallel to the south breaks up in the middle of the borough, forming the Redhill basin and various mounds around Reigate before continuing in both directions at higher elevations, see the Greensand Way. The Mole forms a section of the western border of the borough down to Wonham Mill at the western extreme of Flanchford in the Reigate post town, itself at a millpond at the foot of the wooded Snag Brook a tributary which rises near the A25 Dorking Road. Much of the borough is Metropolitan Green Belt.

There are significant areas of forest and heath management, including five reserves within the national wildlife trust scheme: see Surrey Wildlife Trust.

== Settlements and parishes ==
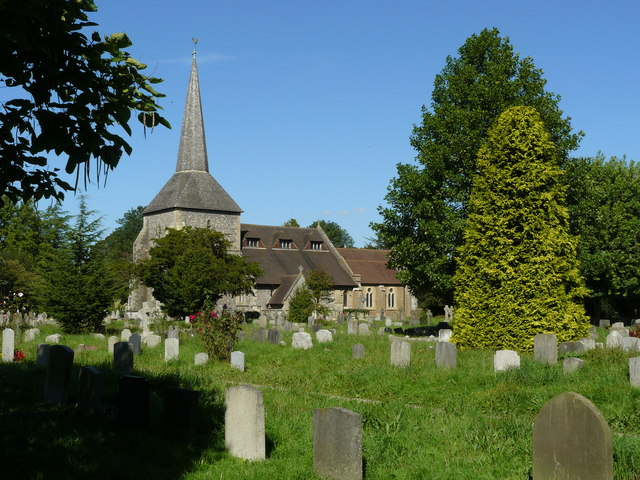
Banstead parish church

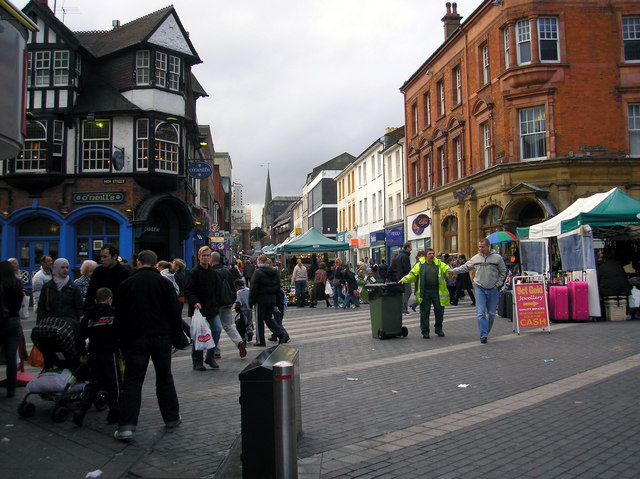
Town centre of Redhill

There are only two civil parishes in the borough, being Horley, and Salfords and Sidlow. The parish council for Horley has declared its parish to be a town, allowing it to take the style "town council". The pre-1974 borough of Reigate and urban district of Banstead form an unparished area.

Settlements and suburbs in the borough include:

- Banstead
- Burgh Heath
- Chipstead
- Earlswood
- Epsom Downs (part) (Note: Despite the name, the built-up part of Epsom Downs around Epsom Downs railway station is in Reigate and Banstead, and not in the borough of Epsom and Ewell.)
- Gatton
- Hooley
- Horley
- Kingswood
- Lower Kingswood
- Margery
- Meadvale
- Merstham
- Mogador
- Netherne-on-the-Hill
- Nork
- Redhill
- Reigate
- Salfords
- Sidlow
- Tadworth
- Tattenham Corner
- Walton-on-the-Hill
- Whitebushes
- Woodhatch
- Woodmansterne

== Economy ==
The economy is diverse, with a strong local service sector, city workers as most locations are easily within the London Commuter Belt, trades, a developed public/education sector and several farms concentrated towards cereal and root vegetable agriculture. There is an extent of woodland management. Several employers with an international renown are found in force in and around the two most commercial towns centres of Reigate and Redhill: including Willis Towers Watson, Just, Kimberly Clark, Travelers Group (insurance), AXA Insurance breakdown, Black & Veatch and Esure. Pfizer UK headquarters is by the M25 motorway in Walton-on-the-Hill. Notably Sutton and East Surrey Water is headquartered in Redhill and SGN in Horley. A choice of hotels exists in and around Horley including its adjacent neighbourhood, sometimes named independently by businesses and residents, Hookwood, on the east and north outskirts of London Gatwick Airport respectively.

In the late 20th century the airline Dan-Air had its head office in the Newman House in Horley, and Air Europe had its head office in Reigate.

== Transport ==
=== Roads ===
The M25 motorway passes from the middle of the east of the borough to just south of the tripoint with Epsom and Ewell and Mole Valley and has two junctions, one for the M23 motorway that passes through the eastern side of the borough north–south and starts in the northeast of the borough, the other at Reigate Hill. The A23 road from London splits into the ongoing A23 from the south and the M23 at Hooley.

The A217 road is a second London road starting in Reigate via Banstead and Sutton and on to London. Two traditional, mostly up to county distance alternatives inspired the names of the north–south/east-west motorway: the low A25 between Godstone/Guildford and the A23, the latter being used for the London to Brighton events.

=== Rail ===
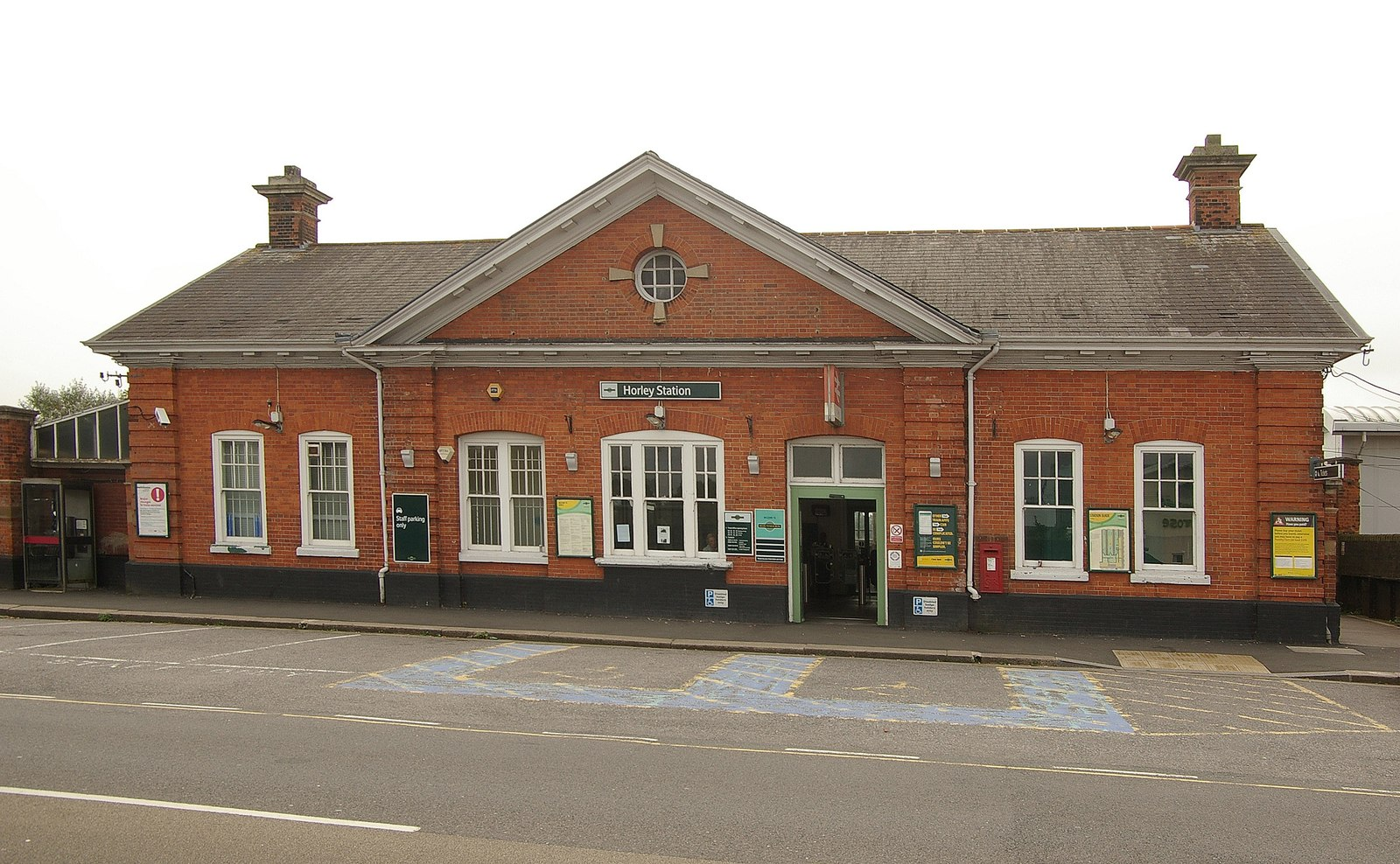
Horley railway station on the Brighton Main Line

The main train operator in the borough is Southern, with other services being operated by Thameslink and Great Western Railway. Through routes are the North Downs Line and the more heavily used London to Brighton line that has several operators plus several branch service routes operating to London (the destination in the borough of one such service is Reigate). Although these are the main railways for long and short-distance travel, two branch lines cut through lower parts of the North Downs plateau in the north (to Tattenham Corner via Kingswood and to Epsom Downs via Banstead, all four stations being in the borough).

== Twinning ==
The borough is twinned with:

- Eschweiler in North Rhine-Westphalia, Germany since 1985
- Brunoy in Essonne, France since 1991

== Coat of arms ==
The coat of arms is a combination of the elements of the Reigate shield, the device of Banstead and symbols of the parishes of Horley and Salfords and Sidlow.

The shield has a background of blue and yellow chequers taken from the arms of the de Warenne family. William de Warenne accompanied William the Conqueror from Normandy and was the first Earl of Surrey and the builder of Reigate Castle. Against this pattern is the Reigate Castle Gate and oak tree.

The top of the shield has a black background as in the original Reigate arms but on which is a gold woolpack between two sprigs of oak. The woolpack or woolsack refers to the former importance of sheep rearing and wool production in Banstead. The oak sprigs represent the two parishes of Horley and Salfords and Sidlow.

Above the shield is a helmet with a wreath and draped cloth also in the blue and gold of the de Warennes. On top of the helmet is a pilgrim referring to the ancient route along the escarpment of the North Downs by Banstead and Reigate, the Pilgrims Way.

On either side of the shield is a white lion and a white horse. The lion comes from the arms of the de Mowbray family who were briefly Lords of the Manor of Banstead in the 12th century. The horse refers to the tradition of horse racing on Banstead Downs in the 17th century and immortalised in the Oaks race of Epsom Derby Friday. On the necks of the animals are wreaths again in the blue and yellow. On the shoulders are roundels of blue and white waves indicating the River Mole in Horley and Sidlow.

The roundel on the lion has a tanner's (or flaying) knife, the emblem of St Bartholomew, the patron of Horley, who is said to have been flayed or skinned before he was crucified. The roundel on the shoulder of the horse has a sallow leaf, a reference to Salfords, which is derived from Sallow Ford. The Sallow tree is commonly known as Pussy Willow.

The motto "Never Wonne ne never shall" is taken from an ancient couplet and refers to the defeat of the Danes by King Alfred in a battle in the Vale of Holmesdale in the 9th century, now remembered in the name Battlebridge. Reigate Castle has also been known as Holmesdale Castle. A translation is "Never conquered nor never shall".

== Freedom of the Borough ==
The following people and military units have received the Freedom of the Borough of Reigate and Banstead.

=== Individuals ===
- Ernest A. Crowe (1988)
- Norman C. Smith (1995)
- Dr. Michael "Mike" Ormerod (2007)

=== Organisations ===
- The Princess of Wales's Royal Regiment - (2011)
- Reigate Sea Cadets (TS Ark Royal) - (11th October 2026)
- Banstead Army Cadets - (11th October 2026)
- Redhill Army Cadets - (11th October 2026)
- 135 Squadron RAF Air Cadets Surrey Wing (Reigate and Banstead) - (11th October 2026)

==== The Freedom of the Borough Parade (2026) ====
Reigate and Banstead Borough Council approved the conferral of the Freedom of the Borough of four local units in recognition of their unwavering contributions to civic life in the borough on 22nd July 2026. To mark the conclusion of the first National Cadet Week (2026), The awards were formally presented to the units by Mayor Nick Harrison on the 11th of October 2026 in a ceremony in Priory Park, Reigate with Mayor's Cadets accepting on behalf of their units. The units then exercised their right to Freedom of the Borough, through a ceremonial march past parade, with some of the officers having sabres drawn.

== See also ==
- List of places of worship in Reigate and Banstead
- Reigate Town Hall

== Notes and references ==
=== Notes ===
References
