= List of places in Surrey =

Major towns and conurbations in Surrey

This is a list of towns, villages and most notable hamlets and neighbourhoods in Surrey, a ceremonial and administrative county of England.

For lists relating to parts of London formerly in Surrey, see the London Boroughs of Croydon, Kingston upon Thames (Royal Borough), Richmond upon Thames, Lambeth, Merton, Southwark, Sutton and Wandsworth. Some of these parts of the historic county lay, until its 1996 official disestablishment, in a fourth definition of Surrey: the postal county.

Bordering counties, west to east, are Berkshire, Hampshire, West Sussex, Greater London, East Sussex and Kent.

== A ==
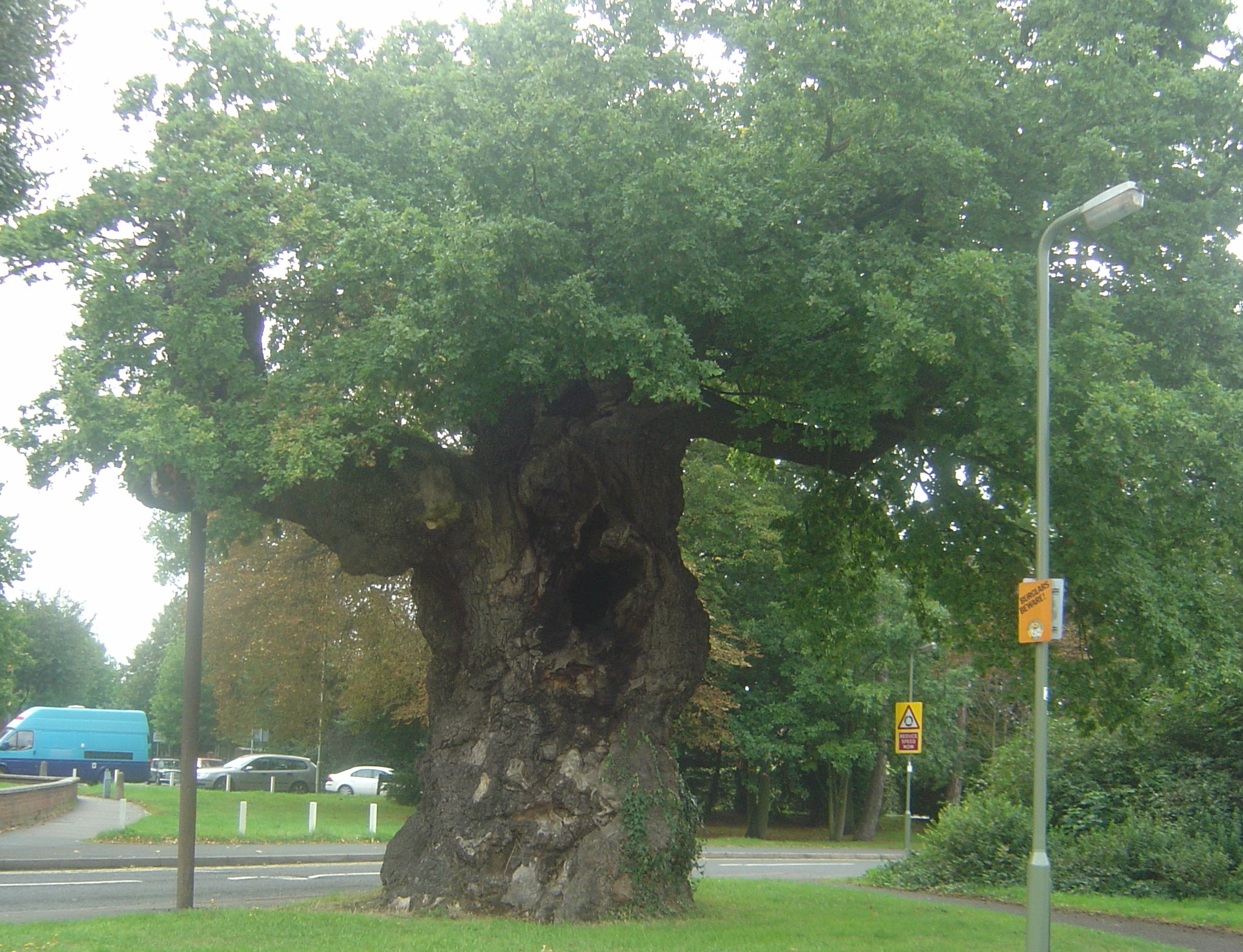
The Crouch Oak Tree, Addlestone

- Abinger, Addlestone, Albury, Alfold, Artington, Ash, Ash Vale, Ashford, Ashtead
  - Abbotswood in Guildford
  - Abinger Common and Abinger Hammer in Abinger
  - Ashford Common in Ashford
  - Ambleside in Walton-on-Thames
  - Ashley Park in Walton-on-Thames

== B ==
- Badshot Lea, Bagshot, Banstead, Betchworth, Bisley, Bletchingley, Bookham (Great and Little), Box Hill, Bramley, Brockham, Brookwood, Buckland, Burgh Heath, Burpham, Burstow, Busbridge, Byfleet
  - Beacon Hill in Haslemere
  - Beare Green in Capel
  - Bellfields in Guildford
  - Birtley Green in Bramley
  - Blackheath in Wonersh
  - Blindley Heath in Godstone
  - Broadford in Chobham
  - Brook in Wormley
  - Brooklands in Weybridge
  - Brookwood Heath in Brookwood
  - Burntcommon in Send
  - Burwood Park in Hersham and Walton-on-Thames

== C ==
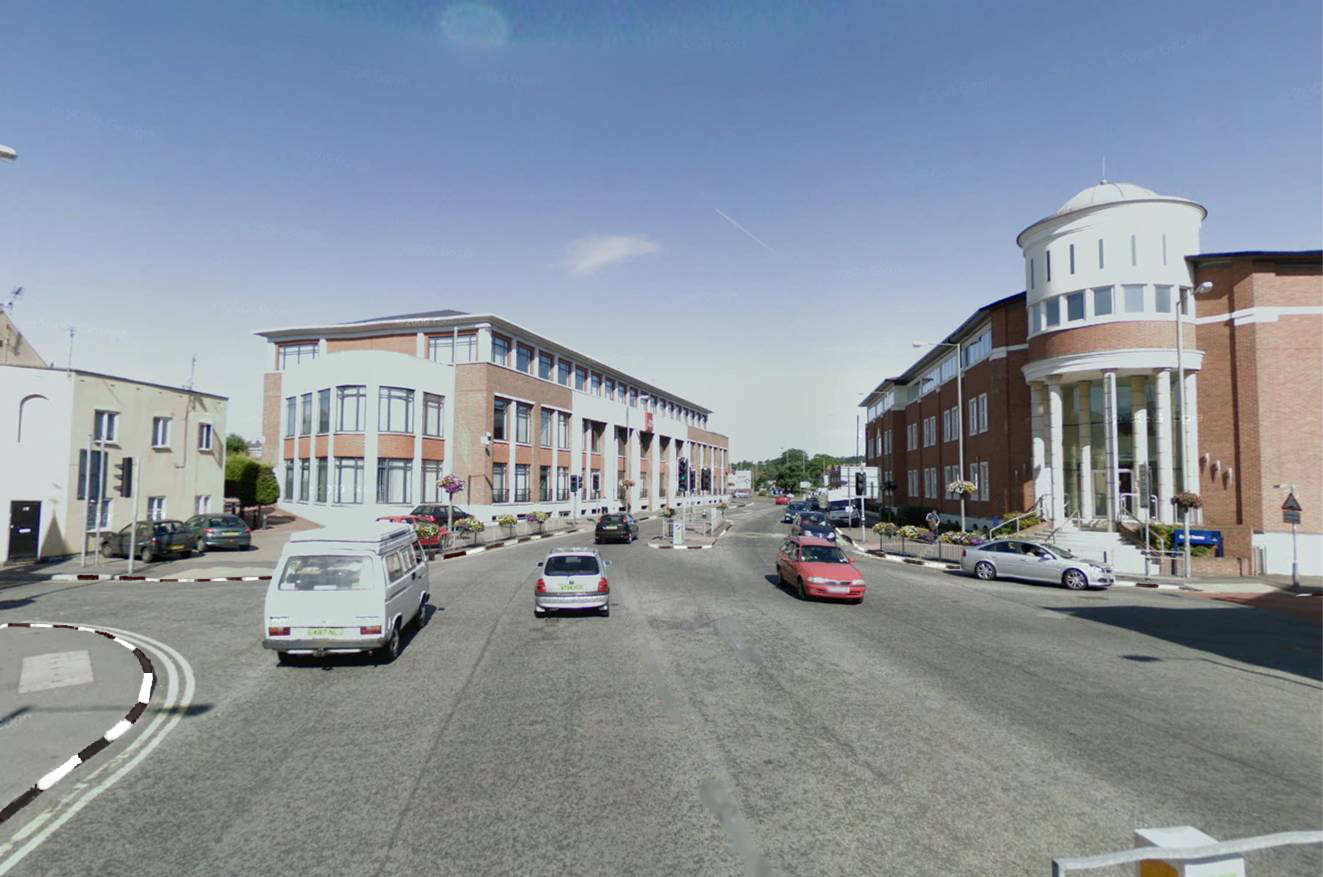
Pyrcroft Road, Chertsey

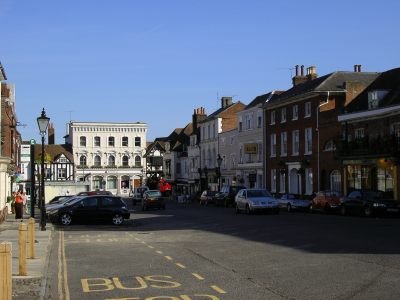
Castle Street, Farnham

- Camberley, Capel, Caterham, Chaldon, Charlwood, Chertsey, Chiddingfold, Chilworth, Chipstead, Chobham, Churt, Claygate, Cobham, Compton (Borough of Guildford), Compton (Waverley), Cranleigh
  - Caterham on the Hill and Caterham Valley in Caterham
  - Castle End in Egham
  - Castle Green in Chobham
  - Catteshall in Godalming
  - Charlotteville in Guildford
  - Charlton in Shepperton
  - Coldharbour in Newdigate
  - Cooper's Hill in Englefield Green
  - Cudworth in Newdigate

== D ==
- Deepcut, Dockenfield (part), Dorking, Dormansland, Downside, Dunsfold

== E ==
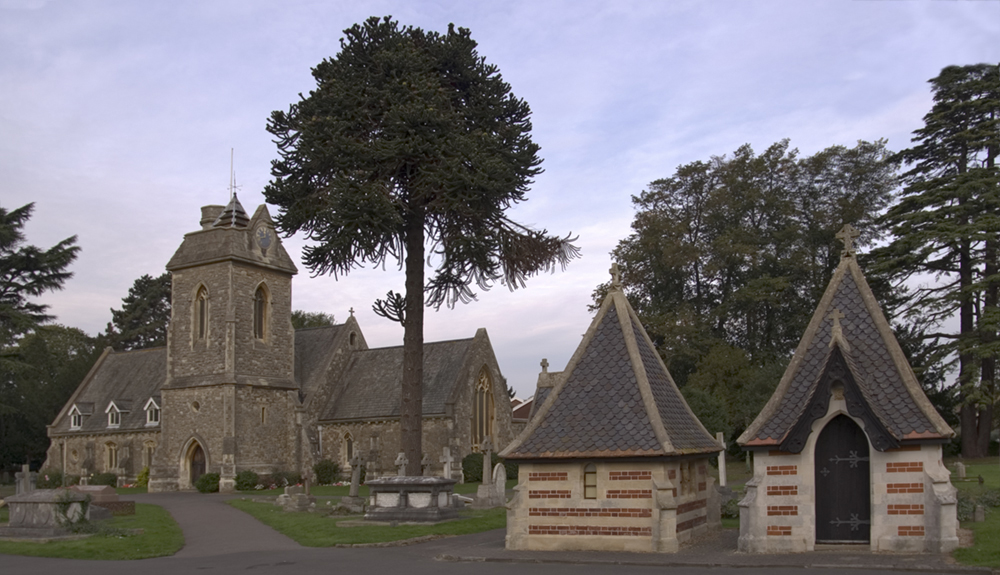
Church & Mausolea at Englefield Green.

- East Clandon, East Horsley, East Molesey, Effingham, Egham, Ellen's Green, Elstead, Englefield Green, Epsom, Esher, Ewell, Ewhurst
  - Earlswood in Redhill
  - East Ewell in Ewell
  - Egham Hythe in Egham
  - Effingham Junction in Effingham
  - Enton in Witley
  - Enton Green in Enton

== F ==
- Farnham, Felbridge, Felcourt, Fetcham, Frensham, Frimley, Frimley Green
  - Fairlands in Worplesdon
  - Fairmile in Cobham
  - Farley Green in Albury
  - Farncombe in Godalming
  - Flexford in Normandy
  - Forest Green in Abinger
  - Friday Street in Wotton
  - Frith Hill in Godalming

== G ==
- Godalming, Godstone, (Great) Bookham, Guildford
  - Gatwick in Shackleford
  - Givons Grove in Leatherhead
  - Goldsworth Park in Woking
  - Gomshall in Shere
  - Grafham in Bramley
  - Guildford Park in Guildford

== H ==
- Hale, Hambledon, Hascombe, Haslemere, Headley, Hersham, Hinchley Wood, Hooley, Horne, Horley, Horsell, Hydestile
  - Hamm Court in Addlestone
  - Heath End in Farnham
  - Heatherside in Camberley
  - Hindhead in Haslemere
  - Holland in Oxted
  - Holmbury St Mary in Shere
  - Hook Heath in Woking
  - Hookwood in Horley
  - Hurst Green in Oxted
  - Hurst Park in West Molesey
  - Hurtmore in Shackleford

== J ==
- Jacobs Well

== K ==
- Kingswood
  - Kempton Park in Sunbury
  - Knaphill in Woking

== L ==
- Laleham, Leatherhead, Leigh, Lightwater, Limpsfield, Lingfield, Little Bookham, Littleton, Long Ditton, Longcross, Lyne
  - Langley Vale in Epsom
  - Leigh Corner in Cobham
  - Littleton in Artington
  - Lower Bourne in Farnham
  - Lower Green, Esher
  - Lower Halliford in Upper Halliford
  - Lower Kingswood in Kingswood
  - Lower Sunbury in Sunbury-on-Thames

== M ==
- Mayford, Merrow, Merstham, Mickleham, Milford, Molesey (East and West), Mytchett
  - Martyrs Green in Ockham
  - Maybury in Woking
  - Meadvale in Reigate and Redhill
  - Meath Green in Horley
  - Mimbridge in Chobham
  - Mount Herman in Woking

== N ==
- Newdigate, New Haw, Nork, Normandy, North Holmwood, Nutfield
  - Netherne-on-the-Hill in Hooley
  - Newchapel in Horne
  - Norney in Shackleford
  - New Malden in Horne

== O ==
- Oakwoodhill, Oatlands, Ockham, Ockley, Ottershaw, Outwood, Oxshott, Oxted
  - Old Merstham in Merstham
  - Old Shepperton in Shepperton
  - Old Woking in Woking
  - Onslow Village in Guildford

== P ==
- Peper Harow, Pirbright, Pixham, Puttenham, Pyrford
  - Pachesham in Leatherhead
  - Park Barn in Guildford
  - Peaslake in Shere
  - Peasmarsh in Shalford
  - Pennypot in Chobham
  - Pitch Place in Guildford
  - Povey Cross in Horley

== R ==
- Redhill, Reigate, Ripley, Rowledge
  - Ranmore Common in Effingham
  - Row Town in Addlestone
  - Rydeshill in Guildford

== S ==
- Salfords, Seale, Send, Shackleford, Shalford, Shepperton, Shere, South Nutfield, Staines-upon-Thames, Stanwell, Stoke D'Abernon, Stoneleigh (part), Sunbury-on-Thames, Sutton Green
  - Sandown Park in Esher
  - Send Marsh in Send
  - Shamley Green in Wonersh
  - Sheerwater in Woking
  - Shottermill in Haslemere
  - Slyfield in Guildford
  - Smallfield in Burstow
  - Smithbrook in Bramley
  - South Godstone in Godstone
  - St George's Hill in Weybridge, Hersham & Walton-on-Thames
  - St John's (Redhill)
  - St John's (Woking)
  - Stanwell Moor in Stanwell
  - Stoke in Guildford
  - Stoughton in Guildford
  - Stroude in Virginia Water

== T ==
- Tadworth, Tandridge, Tatsfield, Thames Ditton, Thorpe, Thursley, Tilford, Titsey, Tongham
  - Thorncombe Street in Bramley
  - Tattenham Corner in Banstead
  - Tekels Park in Camberley (previously called Frimley Park until it is said lost in a card game)
  - The Acres in Horley
  - The Sands in Seale
  - Trumps Green in Virginia Water
  - Thorpe in Thorpe

== U ==
- Upper Halliford
  - Upper Bourne in Farnham
  - Upper Kingswood or Kingswood in Kingswood

== V ==
- Virginia Water

== W ==
- Walton-on-Thames, Walton-on-the-Hill, Wanborough, Warlingham, West Byfleet, West Clandon, West Horsley, West Molesey, Westhumble, West End, Westcott, Weybourne, Weybridge, Whitebushes, Whyteleafe, Windlesham, Wisley, Witley, Woking, Woldingham, Wonersh, Woodham, Woodmansterne, Wood Street Village, Wormley, Worplesdon, Wotton, Wrays, Wrecclesham
  - Walliswood in Abinger
  - Wentworth in Virginia Water
  - Westborough in Guildford
  - West End in Esher
  - West Ewell in Ewell
  - Westfield in Woking
  - Weston Green in Thames Ditton
  - Whiteley Village in Hersham
  - Willey Green in Normandy
  - Wonersh Common in Wonersh
  - Woodbridge Hill in Guildford
  - Woodhatch in Reigate
  - Wray Common in Reigate and Redhill
  - Wyke in Normandy
