= Wyke, Surrey =

Village in Surrey, England

Coordinates: 51.257°N 0.658°W

Wyke
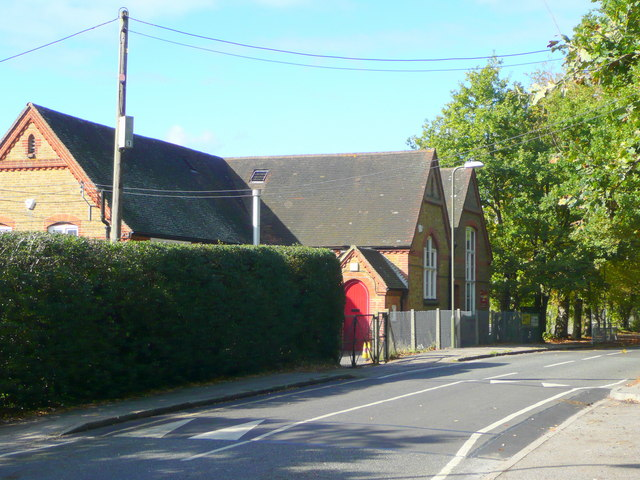
- Wyke Primary School

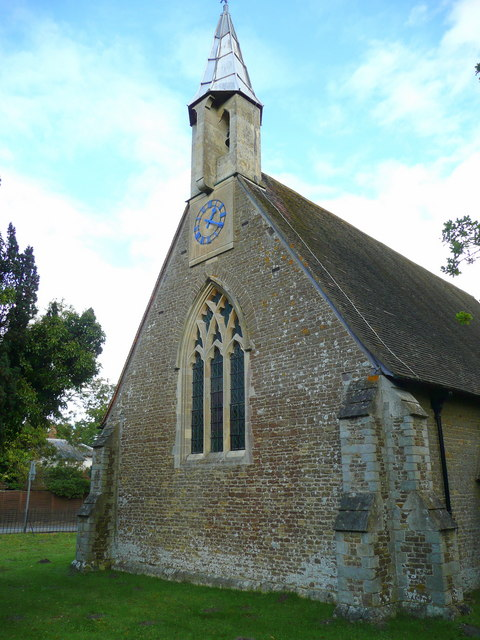
- St Mark's, the Parish Church of Wyke

- Location within Surrey
- Area: 16.37 km^{2} (6.32 sq mi)
- Population: 2,981 (area and population applies to civil and ecclesiastical parish in which Normandy and Wyke are indistinct from each other, as opposed to various map distinctions)
  - Density: 182/km^{2} (470/sq mi)
- OS grid reference: SU9151
- Civil parish: Normandy
- District: Guildford
- Shire county: Surrey
- Region: South East
- Country: England
- Sovereign state: United Kingdom
- Post town: Guildford
- Postcode district: GU3
- Dialling code: 01483
- Police: Surrey
- Fire: Surrey
- Ambulance: South East Coast
- UK Parliament: Surrey Heath

Wyke is a rural and suburban village in Surrey, England. Its local government district is the Borough of Guildford. The nearest town is Aldershot, 2 miles (3.2 km) west although the large village/town of Ash, Surrey is 1 mile (1.6 km) west and has more shops than smaller Wyke and adjacent Normandy combined. Normandy, Surrey is also dispersed yet is typically marked just 0.25 miles (0.40 km) east, near its manors. Normandy, Flexford and Christmas Pie share the parish church of Wyke, being relatively central to the four former hamlets. Wyke shares in the sports associations and community groups of Normandy.

== History ==
Wyke, unlike the larger settlement of Flexford, appears in the Domesday Book of 1086 as Wucha held by Godric from (Turald) Thorold under Roger de/of Montgomery. It was part of Burpham manor and was valued underneath its listing. As heads of household it had four villagers, three smallholders, one serf (a form of slavery abolished by the time of Magna Carta), two ploughlands and woodland for 83 pigs, 25 acres of meadow and a mill worth 15s per year. It rendered 8 pound sterling per year to its feudal system overlords.

One side of the roadside common of Normandy has medieval homes and farmhouses, 0.25 miles (0.40 km) east. Wyke has two farmhouses pre-dating 1600.

Wyke as a wider parish than its topographical definition was formed out of Ash, Worplesdon and Wanborough in 1847 when its church was built. Most of this combined land of Wyke, Normandy, Flexford and Christmas Pie was an outcrop of Worplesdon surrounded by the south-east of the parish of St Peter, Ash, which was the largest medieval parish in Woking Hundred.

== Geography ==
The maximum elevation is 118m at Normandy/Gravel Pit hill in the north, at the south of the long ridge known as the Chobham Ranges, but between Deepcut and West End, Surrey. The minimum is 50m at Westwood Hall, a former manor, at the start of the Normandy locality, where the headwaters of a brook merge into one in the east. The soil is sandy and (acidic) heath towards the escarpment shielding the Ministry of Defence training land directly north of Wyke, but otherwise is a loam/clay mixture.

Its local government district is the Borough of Guildford. The nearest town is Aldershot, 2 miles (3.2 km) west although the large village of Ash, Surrey is 1 mile (1.6 km) west and has many amenities. Normandy, Surrey can also be categorised as dispersed rather than polyfocal but has slightly more amenities.

== Amenities ==
Wyke has one place of worship, that of St Mark in the Church of England building of which completed in November 1846 as a chapel.

Normandy Village School, part of the South Farnham Educational Trust, is a primary school (ages 4–11) on School Lane. Its roots are Wyke National (Secular) School in 1874 which was enlarged 1896.

For recreational and community hall purposes Wyke has a civil parish, that of Normandy.

== Notable residents ==
- James Stirling, former Governor of Western Australia is buried in St Marks Churchyard in Wyke.
