= Jacobs Well, Surrey =

Village in Surrey, England

Coordinates: 51°16′17″N 0°34′03″W

Jacobs Well
- Village
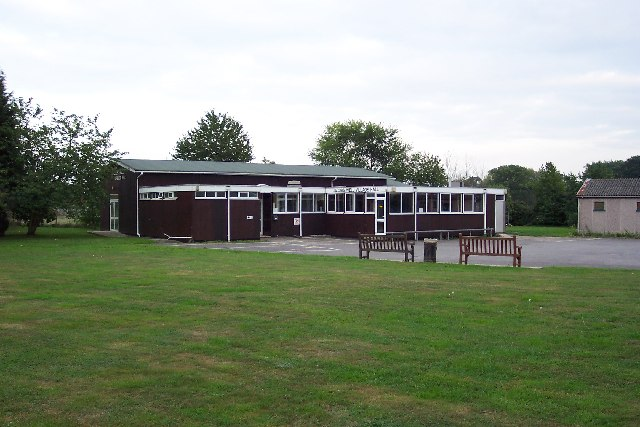
- Village Hall on an edge of the network of residential roads

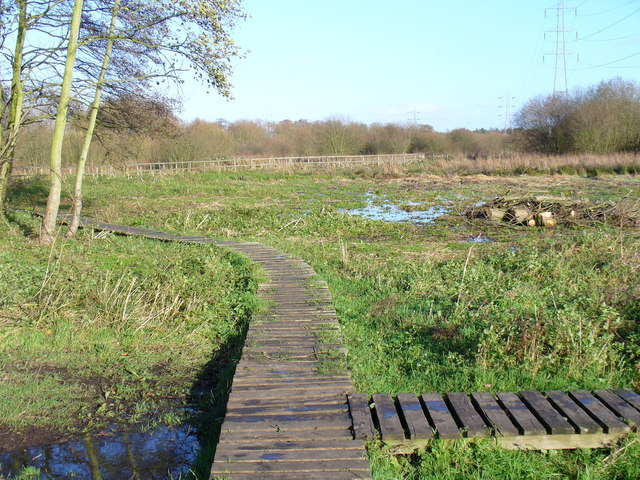
- Boardwalk in Riverside Park in flood-meadows north of the settlement by the River Wey

- Location within Surrey
- Population: 1,171
- OS grid reference: TQ0053
- District: Guildford
- Shire county: Surrey
- Region: South East
- Country: England
- Sovereign state: United Kingdom
- Post town: Guildford
- Postcode district: GU4
- Dialling code: 01483
- Police: Surrey
- Fire: Surrey
- Ambulance: South East Coast
- UK Parliament: Guildford

Jacobs Well or Jacobswell (Note: The Jacobswell alternative spelling is shown in a large minority of maps and signposts) is a small village in Surrey, England, of 20th century creation, with a population of 1,171. The village forms a northern outskirt of Guildford, in the civil parish of Worplesdon which can be considered the mother village of medieval date to the west. The Stoke Hill part of Stringers Common, Slyfield Industrial Estate and a Surrey County Council general waste transfer station to the south form the narrowest of its buffer zones to all sides, separating the Slyfield part of Guildford from the village.

Between Jacobs Well and Burpham to the south-east and east lie the River Wey, Burpham Court Farm Park (Note: Its 'rare breeds' centre in the Metropolitan Green Belt is currently closed), the River Wey Navigation, and the A3, in that order.

Other nearby settlements include Sutton Green (beyond which is Old Woking) to the NNE.

== History ==
The manor of Burgham Court (now reflected in the farmhouse of Burpham Court) owned most of the land on the east side of the parish until the early 20th century. It was a major source of poor relief and public works under the local vestry. Outskirts of the land remain common land not owned by the lord of the manor. The manor was handed down via lines of the interconnected Wintershull/Wintershall, Bassett, Unwyn, Windsor, Wolley and Wroth families from Thurstan le Dispenser at the time of the Testa de Nevill. Ultimately purchased in 1720, becoming part of the major landholdings of the Earl of Onslow who held it until the early 20th century.

Jacobs Well was the site of a fatal aircraft crash on 25 October 1944. A USAAF C47 crashed in a field, killing its crew of four. A plaque, on the corner of Queenhythe Road and Clay Lane, commemorates the accident.

== Amenities ==
Aside from the green buffers to all sides, principally Whitmoor Common to the west, which is the largest, amenities include a scout hut and village hall.

A visitor attraction within these buffers is the gardens of the Tudor Sutton Place, in the borough of Woking to the north-east.

Boats are available for hire in Stoughton, and elsewhere, for use on the River Wey Navigation, which forms the effective boundary of the village to the east. Bowers Lock is 0.6 miles (0.97 km) to the east, accessible from Clay Lane, the road to Burpham.

Safeguard Coaches have their depot on Clay Lane.

== Religion ==
There is no church in the village, the nearest place of worship is St Peter's Church in Bellfields. The denomination is Anglican.

== Transport links ==
The village is on two significant through roads: the A320 from Guildford to Woking and the unclassified road, Clay Lane, that links Worplesdon to Burpham and the A3.

The railway between Woking and Guildford, the Portsmouth Direct Line, marks the practical boundary of the village to the west, however the nearest stations are Worplesdon and Guildford. The nearest of these, Worplesdon is 1.6 miles (2.6 km) away.

Jacobs Well has roughly half-hourly bus services to and from Guildford and Woking.

== Notes and references ==
Notes
