= Woking Hundred =

Historical division of Surrey, England

Coordinates: 51.27°N 0.55°W

See Woking for the town or Borough of Woking for the district.

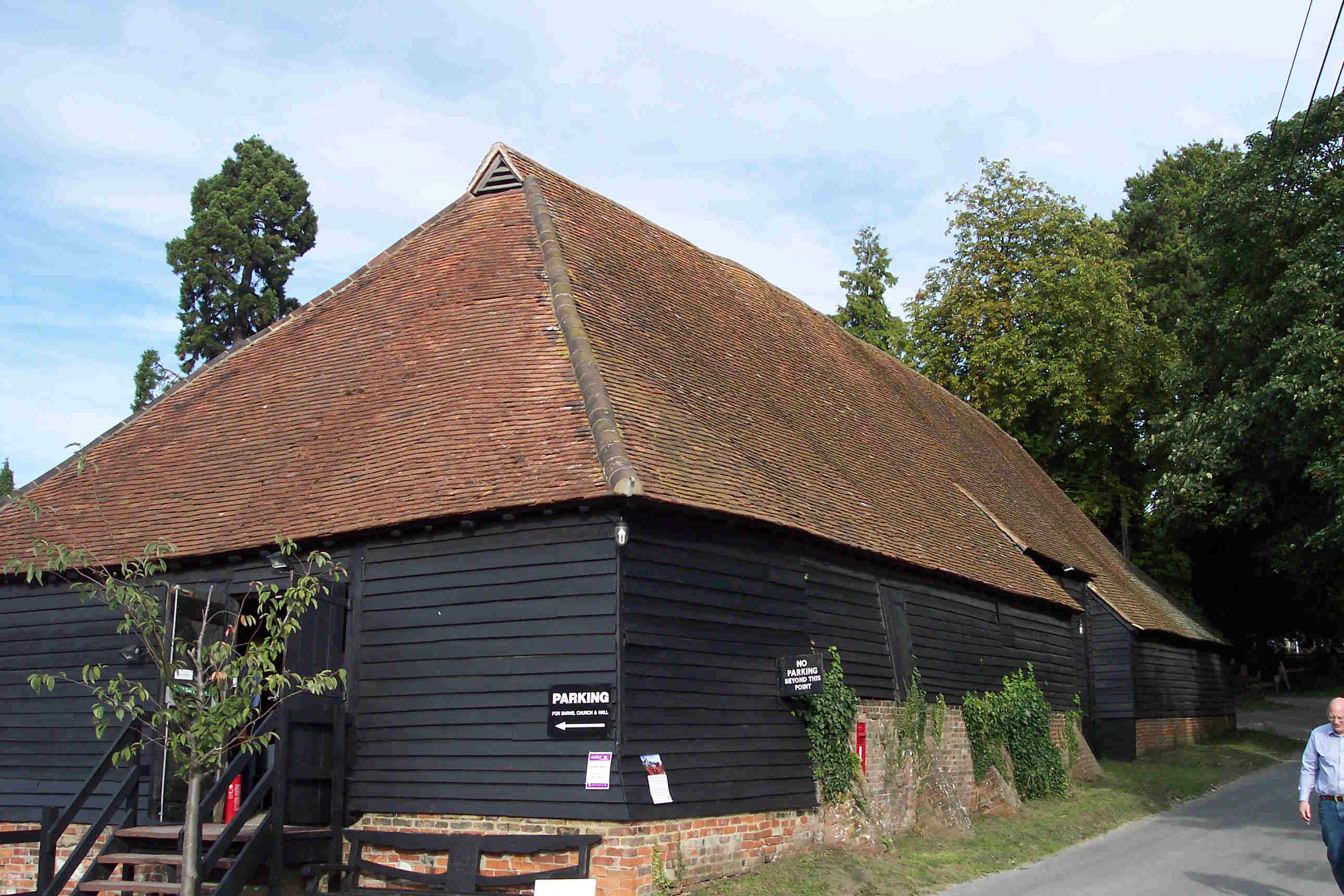
The Great Barn, Wanborough lay within the Woking Hundred.

Woking was a hundred in what is now Surrey, England. It includes the town of Woking and the Borough of Woking.

The Hundred comprised the parishes of: Ash, East Clandon, West Clandon, East Horsley, West Horsley, Merrow, Ockham, Pirbright, Send and Ripley, Stoke Juxta Guildford, Wanborough, Windlesham, Wisley, Woking and Worplesdon.

Minor clerical errors and convenience groupings of other parishes have occurred in some medieval centrally held records at Lambeth and Westminster Palaces for example.

In the time of Edward the Confessor, the Hundred was worth £88; by the Domesday Book of 1086 it was worth £125. By 1696, it was worth £297 for taxation purposes ('taxable value') but being a Hundred had no single owner as such; as the rights of the hundreds became divided and lessened, it became purely a useful way of grouping the parishes below the level of the counties.

== See also ==
- Later Medieval Surrey
- Surrey hundreds
