= Sutton Green, Surrey =

Settlement in Surrey, England

Coordinates: 51.281°N 0.558°W

Sutton Green
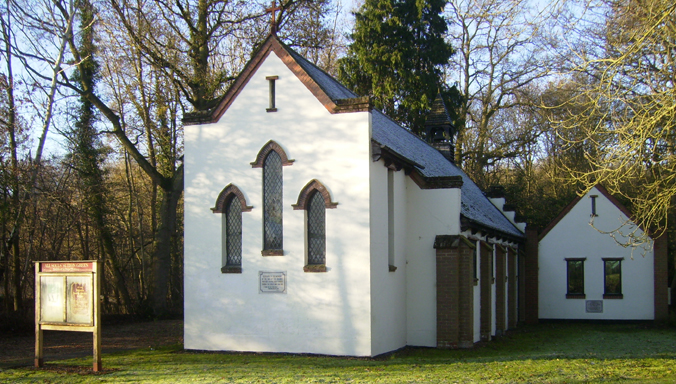
- All Souls', Sutton Green

- Location within Surrey
- Area: 5.77 km^{2} (2.23 sq mi)
- Population: 727 (2011 census)
  - Density: 126/km^{2} (330/sq mi)
- OS grid reference: TQ0054
- District: Woking
- Shire county: Surrey
- Region: South East
- Country: England
- Sovereign state: United Kingdom
- Post town: GUILDFORD
- Postcode district: GU
- Dialling code: 01483
- Police: Surrey
- Fire: Surrey
- Ambulance: South East Coast
- UK Parliament: Woking

Sutton Green is a semi-rural suburban settlement and area of Metropolitan Green Belt between Guildford and Woking, Surrey. Sutton Green neighbours Jacobs Well in the Borough of Guildford.

== Geography ==
=== Physical geography and protected land ===
Sutton Green is a semi-rural suburban or dispersed settlement and area of Metropolitan Green Belt, between Guildford and Woking, Surrey. Sutton Green neighbours Jacobs Well; part of its easternmost fields is in the flood risk area of the River Wey, being a purposeful long flood meadow as a consequence of the river's many channels and improvements such as the Wey Navigation which passes to the west then east (Send, Surrey side) of the main channel here. The south of the parish is a prominent terrace above a long meander of the Wey including Sutton Place itself. A low contour of this terrace and brief section, north, is ancient woodland. The land is mostly Historic Landscape, in shades, the centre-south, Ladymead Farm being red and adjoining Sutton Place, deep green. West of Sutton Green are farm-separated Prey Heath and Whitmoor Common that is a Surrey Wildlife Trust SSSI.

=== Administrative geography and local plan ===
As of the last (2004) 8 to 10-year review, the area is in a slightly redrawn Mayford and Sutton Green one-councillor electoral ward of the Borough. It is in the Woking South County division. There is a range of community facilities serving the local area including the Mayford Centre and the village hall; Local Plan policies resist the loss of community facilities unless there is no longer a need for the facility or where adequate alternative provision is made (policy CUS2).

== Schools ==
Two primary (4-11) schools and an infant and junior school (subdivisions in Send) are approximately two miles from the centre in neighbouring areas; the closest later education provider is at approximately three miles, George Abbot School.

== Places of interest ==
=== Sutton Place Conservation Area ===
"Built Heritage and Conservation

A key feature of the [ward] is Sutton Park and Place. Sutton Place is a Grade I listed building which was built for Sir Richard Weston in the 16th Century. Additionally, Sutton Park and the area extending to Sutton Green has been designated by the Council as a Conservation Area to protect its character. There are a further nine nationally Listed Buildings in the Conservation Area including Oak House, Lady Grove Farmhouse and the Church of St. Edward the Confessor. In addition, the site of the Old Manor House, west of St. Edwards Roman Catholic Church is nationally recognised as a Scheduled Ancient Monument.

The area contains other buildings which are either nationally Listed or Locally Listed for their architectural and historic interest, together with a number of sites where the County Council considers that there may be archaeological remains. The Local Plan aims to [ensure that development]:

- preserves the historic character of the Sutton Park Conservation Area (BE9)
- does not harm the character or setting of the Listed and Locally Listed Buildings in the area (BE10 - BE14)
- does not harm the site of the Old Manor House Scheduled Ancient Monument (BE15)
- [includes] archaeological assessments in Areas of High Archaeological Potential as part of a development proposal (BE16)

— Woking Borough Local Plan, 1999, operative as at March 2015

The original owner and possible architect was Sir Richard Weston a UK politician and courtier with another famous owner being J.Paul Getty, oil magnate and the patriarch of the Getty family who spent the last 25 years of his life at Sutton Place. The current owner is Alisher Usmanov, a Russian businessman.

=== Anglican church ===
All Souls' Church remains part of the parish of St Peter, Woking so is historically termed a chapel. The parish has two other centres of collective or individual worship: St Peter's Church, Old Woking, and St Mark's, Westfield.

=== Catholic church ===
In addition to the Anglican church, there is also a local Roman Catholic church, Holy Family. This started out holding services in the parish hall of All Saints Church. In 1977, the Catholic church built a hall of its own, where services were first held in August of that year. A new church building was constructed in 1988 and dedicated in March 1989.

=== Sutton Green Golf Course ===
Sutton Green has a 71 par golf course co-designed by former world No.1 Laura Davies completed and opened in 1994. The length of the course is 6,480 yards (5,930 m).
