= Burpham, Surrey =

Suburb of Guildford, Surrey, England

Coordinates: 51°15′25″N 0°32′47″W

Burpham
- Suburb
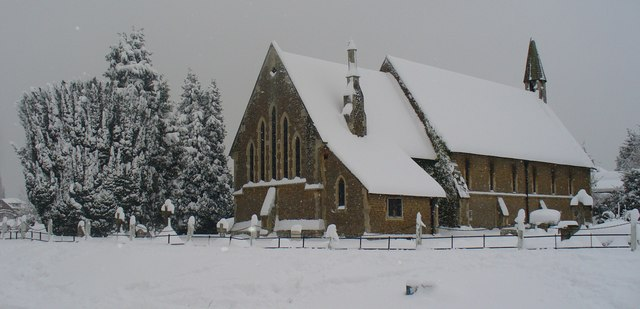
- St Luke's Church, Burpham in snow with part of the Sutherland Memorial Park

- Location within Surrey
- Population: 5,221; 5,695 (2011. Ward)
- OS grid reference: TQ015518
- District: Guildford
- Shire county: Surrey
- Region: South East
- Country: England
- Sovereign state: United Kingdom
- Post town: Guildford
- Postcode district: GU1, GU4
- Dialling code: 01483
- Police: Surrey
- Fire: Surrey
- Ambulance: South East Coast
- UK Parliament: Guildford

There is also a Burpham in West Sussex, England near Arundel.

Burpham /ˈbɜːrfəm/ is a suburb of Guildford, a town in Surrey, England with an historic village centre. It includes George Abbot School, a parade of small shops, and the nationally recognised Sutherland Memorial Park.

Burpham is bordered by the neighbourhoods of Merrow to the south-east and Jacobs Well to the north-west. Burpham is separated from Merrow by the New Guildford Line, the railway line between Guildford and Effingham Junction.

== History ==
Burpham appears in Domesday Book as Borham. It was held partly by Turald (Thorold) from Roger de Montgomery and by Godfric from Thurold. Its domesday assets were: 3 hides; one mill worth 15s, 6½ ploughs, 25 acres (10 ha) of meadow, woodland worth 83 hogs. It rendered £8.

It was, until the consecration of its church, known as the manor of Burpham or Burgham in Worplesdon Its owner in the 13th century was Thurstan le Despenser and it then passed through the Wintershull (by release), Bassett, Unwyn, Wolley, Mainwaring, and finally Wyrley families by relatives. By marriage its owner became Robert Wroth, MP for Guildford in 1704, 1707 and 1714, who died in 1720.

From 1720 the owner of the Manor was Baron Onslow, whose title was elevated to an Earldom from a Barony in the early nineteenth century and who were frequent MPs for Guildford.

Lilac Cottage, co-listed with New Inn Farmhouse, a 17th-century building on London Road with modern extensions and Pimms Row are the listed buildings in the area, with two more in Abbotswood.

== Amenities and places of worship ==
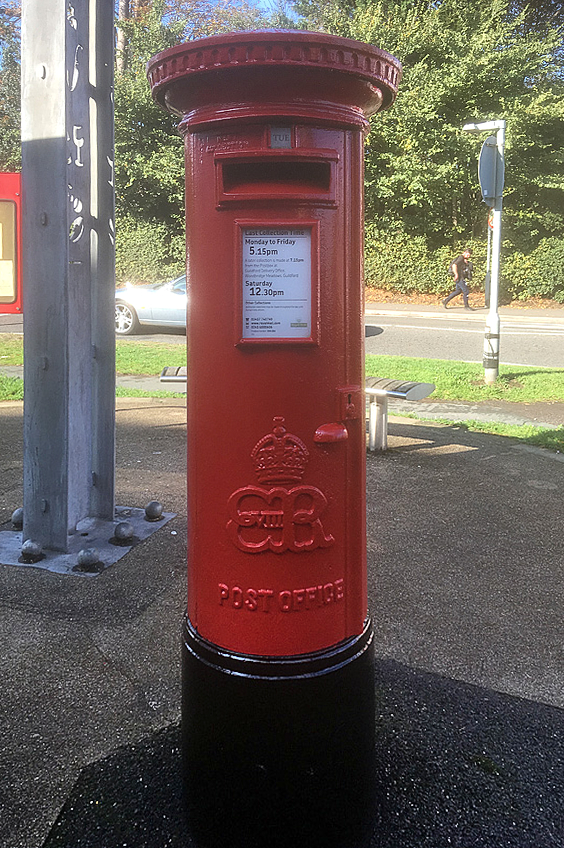
Edward VIII pillar box at London Road shops

Within its bounds are a Sainsbury's superstore, the Surrey County Cricket Centre, two Church of England churches, a police station, a council offices building, a long parade of shops on London Road, a pub, the Anchor and Horseshoes, and in its eastern straight border woodland and to the north-east the working farm of Gosden Hill Farm, partly in the Clandon civil parish and village. The shopping parade incorporates a rare Edward VIII pillar box.

=== St Luke's Church ===
The Church of St Luke is a Grade II listed building. The church is an ornate nineteenth-century work built in 1859 designed by Henry Woodyer fronting the northwest of Sutherland Memorial Park and by a primary school. The war memorial, in front of the church, is also Grade II listed.

=== Holy Spirit Church ===
This is a second Church of England church, in New Inn Lane, serving the parishioners alongside St Luke's. The 1960s building is an unusual structure, with a cross-shaped floorplan, where laminated wooden beams at each corner define both walls and roof.

== Transport ==
Guildford's easternmost junction with the A3 trunk road is named The Burpham Interchange, despite the fact that it is a restricted junction, only providing access for traffic heading to or from the London direction.

Burpham is on several bus routes that start or finish in Guildford. Routes 6 (Guildford - Burpham - Merrow Park - Burpham - Guildford), operated by Stagecoach South, which runs at 20-minute intervals Monday to Saturday and hourly intervals on Sundays and Bank Holidays, and 18 (Guildford - Burpham - Merrow - Burpham - Guildford - Onslow Village), operated by Safeguard Coaches, which runs seven times a day. Route 462, operated by White Bus between Guildford and Woking, join and leave the A3 at Burpham. Buses run bi-hourly Monday to Saturday, with no Sunday service. Additionally, Route 715 between Guildford and Kingston, operated by Falcon Buses, runs the same route through Burpham as Route 462. This is an hourly service Monday to Saturday, and bi-hourly on Sunday.

Bowers Lock is a short distance from the village, on the River Wey Navigation.

== Abbotswood ==
Abbotswood is the closest part of Burpham to Guildford and its only distinctively named neighbourhood. It comprises detached houses and the George Abbot School - it includes a road named Abbotswood and only a few other side roads off London Road such as Boxgrove Avenue; as with Burpham, within the post town of Guildford, directly north and east of the small roundabout north of Stoke Park. The land here ranges from a line of western drained fields at almost river level, named spreads, in flood times, marshland to ascending gentle slopes eastwards including the street Ganghill reaching towards the New Guildford Line railway. It has two listed buildings: Woodways and Stoke Park Farm House.

== Sutherland Memorial Park ==
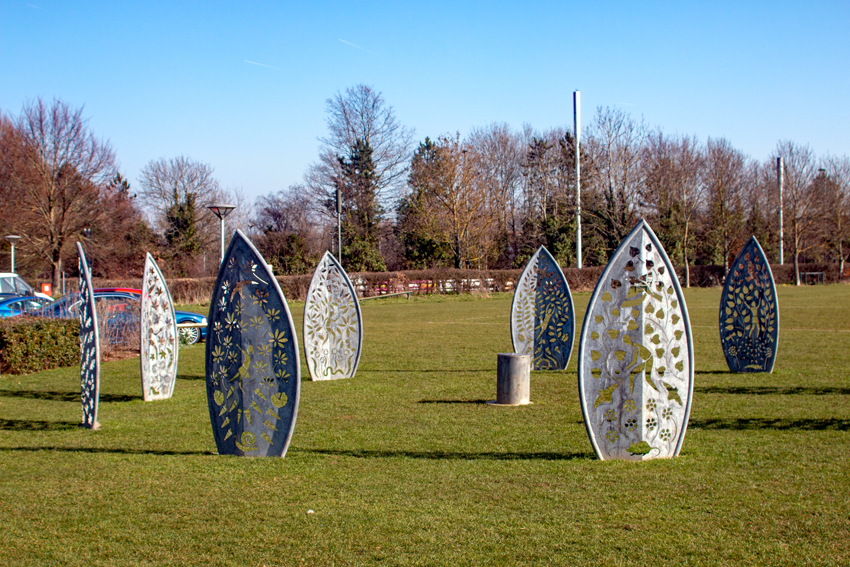
Sutherland Circle sculpture in the park

In the centre of the village is the Sutherland Memorial Park a 6.53-hectare (16.1-acre) open space which is a focus of community life in Burpham. The formal landscaped gardens provide for passive recreation alongside the many sporting facilities offered, and an area has been set aside and planted as a wildflower meadow.

The park was adopted by Guildford Corporation in 1954 after the land was donated by the Duke of Sutherland under a Deed of Gift. It was given as a dedicated War Memorial in memory of the residents of Burpham who were killed on active service during the Second World War. Adjoining land was developed and incorporated in the 1990s, including a car park.

The park has won multiple Green Flag Awards, most recently in 2022.

The multi-use pavilion is home to a local nursery school, and provides changing and other facilities for the sports undertaken in the park. There are playgrounds for all ages, including a separate toddler area and a basketball court for the teenagers. Sports facilities include: a cricket pitch (plus practice nets); two 11-a-side and two (junior) 7-a-side football pitches; two pétanque courts; lawn bowls; and a floodlit artificial pitch providing either three tennis courts or two 5-a-side football pitches. The Park is the home ground of Burpham Football Club, who play in the Premier Division of the Surrey Elite Intermediate League.

== The Green Man ==
The Green Man was a former coaching inn on the original route from Guildford to London; a public house had been on the site for more than 400 years. Between 1984 and 2006, it was a Harvester restaurant, but was sold for redevelopment following its closure. A proposal that the former pub be demolished and replaced by an Aldi supermarket and residential dwellings was opposed by local residents. However, the opposition was unsuccessful, and after Aldi removed the roofing tiles, demolition took place in December 2008. Opposition by local residents continued, but in February 2014, the borough council approved plans for the supermarket. The new 1,380 m^{2} (14,900 sq ft) store opened on 5 November that year.

== Collisions on the A3 ==
Several collisions per year occur on the section of the A3 dual carriage way that runs by the Burpham junction being a London and M25 south-west approach. On Wednesday 11 December 2002, several motorists telephoned to report that a car had veered off the A3. Police officers despatched to the scene found no sign of a newly crashed vehicle but did discover the wreckage of a Vauxhall Astra, containing the remains of a man, no more than 20 metres (66 ft) from the reported crash site. The car was buried in twisted undergrowth, nose-down in a ditch, invisible from the road. A police spokesman later said: "We believe the car left the road and ended up in the ditch during July. It doesn't appear that any other vehicles were involved. The car was discovered as a result of a report from members of the public who thought they saw a car's headlights veering off the road."

== Air accident ==
On 10 January 1954 a light aircraft attempted a forced landing in the fields behind the George Abbot School but clipped a row of trees and spun into the rear garden of the Anchor and Horseshoes pub on the London Road. Fortunately there were no casualties.

== Burpham Court Farm Park ==
Burpham Court Farm Park was a rare breeds centre occupying a former dairy farm on land between Burpham (specifically, north of the Wey Navigation cut to Burpham Lock) and Jacobs Well. Some of the farm buildings date back to 1600. The farm straddles the River Wey on land owned by the National Trust.

Former farmer Bob Dearnley died after a spillage of rat poison on the morning of 28 May 2009. Several emergency personnel were also admitted to hospital. He had been served with an eviction notice having unsuccessfully contested a court case against the council, the land owner, been arrested for affray earlier in the week of his death and incurred very large debts.

The farm house and adjacent cottages are now private dwellings.

== See also ==
- Guildford City F.C. – formerly Burpham F.C.
