= Sutton Green =

Sutton Green can refer to any of the following:

- Sutton Green, Surrey, between Guildford and Woking
- Sutton Green, London, at the north end of Sutton High Street
