= Normandy, Surrey =

Coordinates: 51°15′27″N 0°39′20″W

Normandy
- Village and civil parish
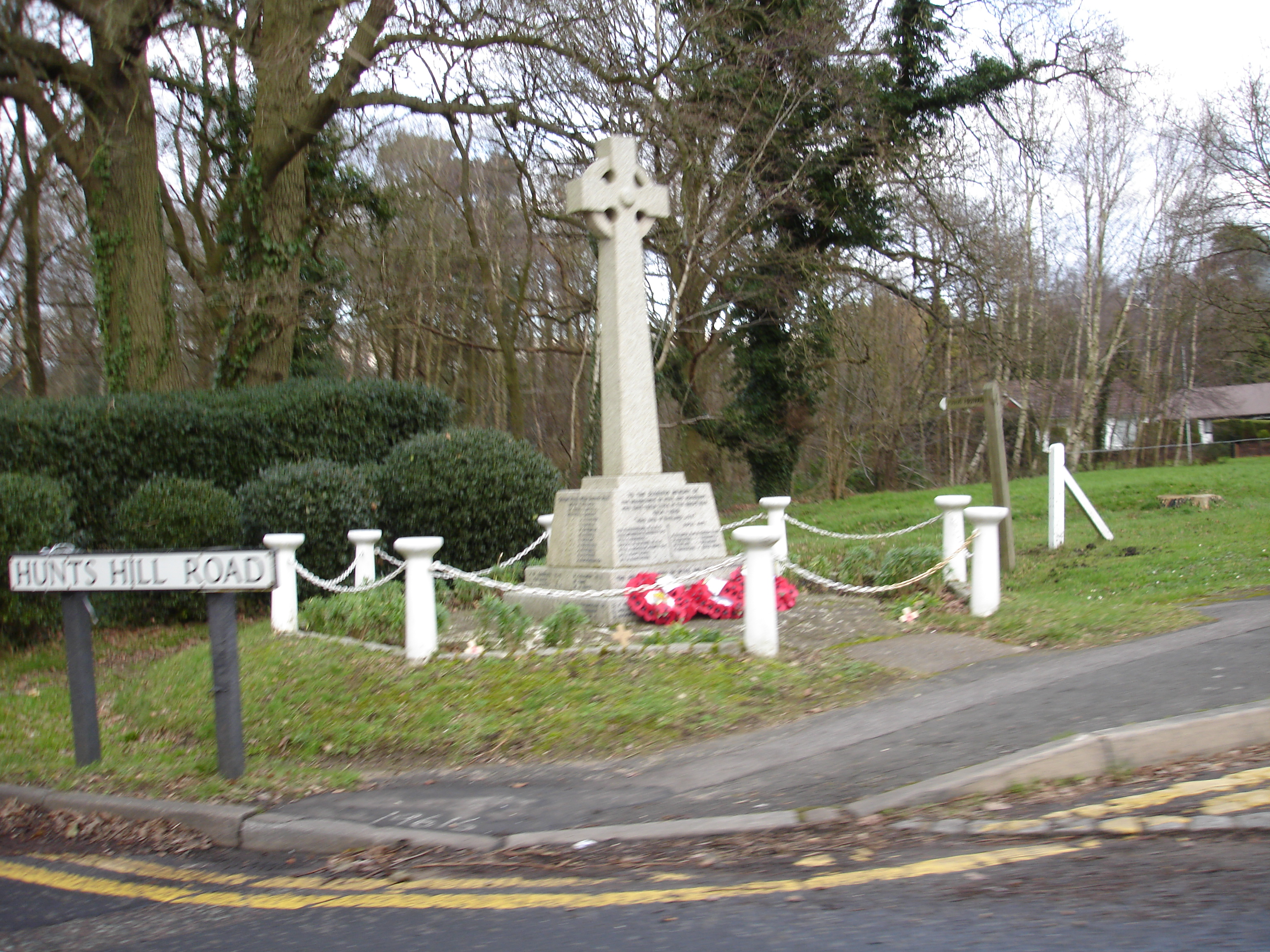
- Normandy war memorial

- Location within Surrey
- Area: 16.37 km^{2} (6.32 sq mi)
- Population: 2,981 (Civil Parish)
  - Density: 182/km^{2} (470/sq mi)
- OS grid reference: SU926516
- Civil parish: Normandy
- District: Guildford
- Shire county: Surrey
- Region: South East
- Country: England
- Sovereign state: United Kingdom
- Post town: Guildford
- Postcode district: GU3
- Dialling code: 01483
- Police: Surrey
- Fire: Surrey
- Ambulance: South East Coast
- UK Parliament: Surrey Heath

Normandy is a village and civil parish of 16.37 square kilometres (4,050 acres) in the borough of Guildford in Surrey, England. Almost surrounded by its hill ranges, Normandy is in the plain west of Guildford, straddles the A323 'Aldershot Road' and is north of the narrowest part the North Downs known as the Hog's Back which carries a dual carriageway. The parish in 2011 had a population of 2,981 living in 1,310 households, has woods, a public common and four government-operated commons to the north that are an SSSI heath. Normandy has been home to a number of notable residents, including William Cobbett.

== Geography ==
As well as the village of Normandy clustered around the crossroads of the Guildford-Aldershot Road (the A323), Hunts Hill Road and Glaziers Lane, the parish also includes Christmas Pie, Willey Green, Wyke, Flexford and Pinewoods. These hamlets, although distinct, are strung together in a swathe of development with largely residential use apart from Pinewoods that is separated by much open land and is close to Ash near to Aldershot. Normandy Common has a picnic site and stream with a path west that leads to Normandy Hill, Wyke overlooking parts of all the heath of nearby commons but not restricted. Four joint commons are north of the partly wooded promontory: Ash, Wyke, Cleygate and Pirbright, an SSSI but also a non-public access Danger Area, in use by the MOD

In the south of the parish, touching an arm of Normandy village and all of Flexford (another clustered development), stands Wanborough railway station, so-called because the owner of the land, diplomat and civil servant Algernon West lived in Wanborough 1 mile (1.6 km) south. Development locally is restricted as the village lies within the Metropolitan Green Belt. Little woods and acid heathland including Normandy Common are scattered in the north; to the south is mainly arable farmland.

== Localities ==
=== Flexford / Christmas Pie ===
Flexford in the south was once called Flaxford, itself a corruption of "flax vard", meaning flax meadows by a stream. The ancient industry here was the creation of linen from flax.

Flexford is, bar a few outlying buildings, one almost inextricable, contiguous settlement with Christmas Pie and the station and railway line to the north of this private estate passes over the Normandy road, residential all the way to Normandy village centre – unusually named Wanborough railway station instead of Flexford and Normandy – for a purely historical reason connected with Lord Wanborough, see Wanborough.

Flexford has a population of 1,163. Flexford's businesses include a garage, and carpentry and roofing contractor firm. Nearby Wood Street Village presents more options, and Guildford is accessible by car or bus – the 694 school bus runs from Christmas Pie via Puttenham to Broadwater School, and the 520 runs five buses per day both ways between Aldershot and Guildford via Flexford. Flexford is part of one of two wards that are within the Guildford borough but are represented by the Member of Parliament for Woking.

Christmas Pie adjoins Flexford on a wide boundary. Christmas Pie owes its curious name to property owned by a prominent local family named Christmas. There are many references to this family in the court records of the manor of Cleygate which date back to 1513 in the reign of King Henry VIII. Christmases are often noted as serving as members of the homage which was the jury of the court. The "Pie" comes from the Saxon term "pightel" or "pightle" meaning a small piece of arable land. Until this was built up during the 1920s, a small field, Pie Field was near the Christmas Pie crossroads. This tiny settlement spans the extreme southern border with Wanborough.

=== Wyke ===
The western part of the parish is Wyke. This appeared in Domesday Book of 1086 as Wucca, a hide (approximately 120 acres) held by Godric from Earl Roger. The Domesday Book mentioned a hall which is thought to have been where East Wyke Farm now stands and where remains of 'Surrey White Ware" pottery have been found. Names such as Wuccha, Wicca, Week and Wick have been used, some of which are preserved in place-names in the hamlet (such as Weekwood). Finally Wyke was settled upon, and this too is the name of the ecclesiastical parish that has covered Normandy since 1847, that of St Mark's Wyke.

=== Pinewoods ===
This more remote western area developed around the beerhouse called the Nightingale in the far west of the parish in the nineteenth century. The woods from which it derives its name are only to be found to the north of the hamlet and this hamlet developed in isolation from the rest of the parish and is still separated from the other hamlets by open land. The buildings of the Nightingale pub remain, now home to an Indian restaurant.

=== Willey Green ===
Willey Green is in part at the lowest point of the parish and was once prone to flooding. Being so located made this area damp and ideal conditions for willow trees to grow and this is where the hamlet derives its name, as the place where willows grow. Now the easternmost part of the hamlet, until the twentieth century it was the westernmost portion of the neighbouring parish of Worplesdon.

=== Westwood ===
Westwood was once a western locality of Normandy, like Willey Green within Worplesdon, but has almost fallen out of use.

== History ==
As a parish, the history of Normandy is the combined history of its constituent hamlets which in modern times include Christmas Pie, Flexford, Willey Green, Wyke, Pinewoods and Normandy proper.

=== Toponymy ===
The earliest known occurrence of the name Normandy is from 1604, when the court records of the Manor of Cleygate refer to Normandy Causeway, previously called Frimsworth Causeway. The same records in the same year also mention a messuage with a garden in Normandy. The name Frimsworth (also Frymsworth, Frymlesworth, Fremsworth, etc.) is much older, being first recorded in 1225, but no longer survives: however, it coexisted for some time with that of Normandy, and the two appear to have referred to different parts of the parish (Frimsworth to an area between Normandy and Willey Green; Normandy to the area around Normandy Common and the manor house known as Normandy Farm, once leased to William Cobbett).

The derivation of the name is uncertain. The village has no direct connection with the Duchy of Normandy, and it is not mentioned in Domesday Book. The Surrey volume of the English Place-Name Society, published in 1934, suggests that the name was taken from the public house called "The Duke of Normandy", and this remains a popular interpretation. However, the pub was built in the 1860s, and is not known to have replaced an earlier building, so it is more likely that it was named after the village rather than the other way around. It has also been suggested that the monks of Waverley Abbey named the village after their homeland in northern France because of a similarity in the local landscapes – but the abbey's landholdings did not extend as far as the village of Normandy. A third speculative theory offered by local historians is that Normandy Common may be the common referred to in the Cleygate records as a part of the manor in the north and west, "lately called Noebodies Common", because it lay on the boundary of two manors: as such, it might also have been referred to as "No Man's Land", which might eventually have been corrupted to "Normandy".

=== Early history ===
There is evidence on the parishes eastern border of Romano-British occupation in the form of temple remains. In late Saxon England the lands were within the holdings of Earl Godwin, father of King Harold Godwinson. Later, the Domesday Book in its account of the manor of Henley (now represented only by the Henley Park manor house) records that the manor covered large parts of what is now Normandy, as well as Ash; Normandy though was not mentioned by name, the name not being known in the records until 1604. The lands remained within the ancient manor of Henley until the end of the 14th century. At this time the manor of Cleygate began to be carved out of the manor of Henley. As a manor, Cleygate is first mentioned when Henry VI granted the manor to his uterine brother, Jasper the Earl of Pembroke. After Jasper was attainted by Edward IV his lands were forfeited, but were passed back to him in 1485 when his attainder was reversed. After that, the Manor passed through a number of hands, reverting to the crown on more than one occasion.

=== History since 1876 ===
By the time the final part of the Manor of Cleygate was sold to the War Department in 1876, most of the Manor had been sold to private individuals, and that included much of what is now the parish of Normandy. The three private estates making up the parish were those of Henley Park, Westwood and Normandy Park. Normandy Farm was the final home of the early 19th century radical reformer and agrarian William Cobbett, the author of Rural Rides.

Into the twentieth century Normandy retained its agricultural base. The locality of Normandy was considered for the site of a "New Town" to be called "New Norman" in the 1943 Town and Country Plan produced by the Surrey Federation of Labour Parties. However, this did not come to pass and the village into the twenty-first century remains protected within London's green belt.

=== Foot-and-mouth outbreak ===
On 3 August 2007 the Department for Environment, Food and Rural Affairs (DEFRA) confirmed that cattle on farmland within the parish were found to be infected with foot-and-mouth disease. This was the first outbreak of its kind in the UK for six years.

== Within Normandy ==
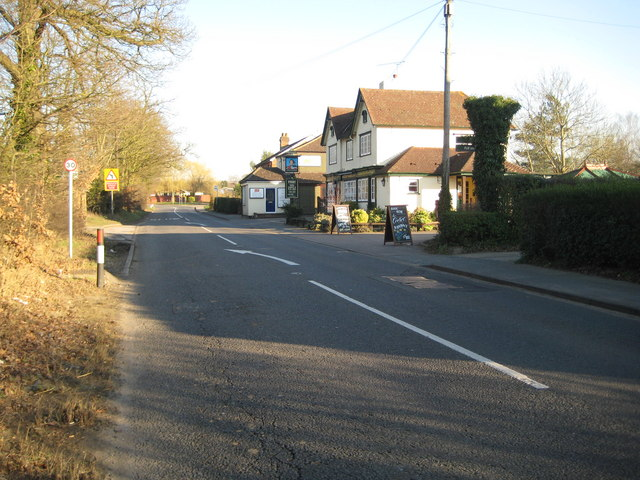
Willey Green, A323 Guildford Road and The Duke of Normandy PH

In its rural setting, many footpaths, bridleways and other small roads suitable for horse riding, cycling and walking criss-cross the parish. Normandy is the start point of the Christmas Pie trail which leads into Guildford through woods, commons and meadows. Normandy has many local clubs (especially sport) set up throughout the village. These include:

Normandy Tennis Club, Normandy Train Club, Normandy Historians, Normandy Cricket Club, Normandy Football Club, Normandy Youth Club–The N-Factor Normandy Scouts and Normandy Archery. Normandy Short Mat bowls club is a thriving club that holds regular roll up sessions and enters into local competitive leagues. It also has a very active social section. Normandy lacks any shops for the purchase of food and other essentials, following the closure of several village shops in 2002.

== Events in Normandy ==
Normandy has an annual Guy Fawkes Night firework display located in a field at the back of The Elms Centre on Glaziers Lane. Car parking is available at The Elms Centre car park during this time. The event usually takes place on 5 November every year. During the event, volunteers parade down a bridleway next to the field holding torches, and throw the torches onto the large bonfire to light it. The fireworks are all set off by hand, not by electronics.

== Education ==
Normandy Village School (previously known as Wyke Primary), founded in 1875, is a school for boys and girls aged 4–11. It is situated on the outskirts of Normandy village and welcomes children from the local community and from the surrounding areas. The current headteacher is Jonathan Franks and the chair of Governors is James Finch. The school is part of the South Farnham Educational Trust and enjoys the support of a parent's association called 'The Friends of NVS' who fundraise for the school.

== Politics ==
Normandy elects one councillor to Guildford Borough Council.

Election	Member	Ward
2019	David John Bilbe	Normandy

To Surrey County Council, elections are also every four years:

Election	Member	Ward
2017	Keith Witham	Worplesdon

There is also an elected Normandy parish council comprising seven members.

Normandy Parish Council Election 2019 (Uncontested)
Councillors	Votes
Margaret Amos	N/A
Geoffrey Doven	N/A
Bob Hutton	N/A
Ally Lawson	N/A
Sarah Noble	N/A
Peter Palmer	N/A
David Simmons	N/A

== Demography and housing ==
In 2011 the population was 2,981 living in 1,310 households. The area is one of the largest civil parishes in Surrey; it stood at 16.37 square kilometres (4,050 acres).

The civil parish was created in 1955, from Ash and Normandy see Ash. Figures are therefore only produced for 1951 and 1961 and after the gap of censuses from ONS data. In the mid twentieth century Flexford and Christmas Pie were not in the parish.

Population of Normandy
Year	1951	1961	2001	2011
Population	2,174	2,434	2,987	2,981

2011 Census Homes
Output area	Detached	Semi-detached	Terraced	Flats and apartments	Caravans/temporary/mobile homes	Shared between households
(Civil Parish)	661	374	58	34	183	0

The average level of accommodation in the region composed of detached houses was 28%, the average that was apartments was 22.6%.

2011 Census Key Statistics
Output area	Population	Households	% Owned outright	% Owned with a loan	hectares
(Civil Parish)	2,981	1,310	49.3%	33.4%	1,637

The proportion of households in the civil parish who owned their home outright compares to the regional average of 35.1%. The proportion who owned their home with a loan compares to the regional average of 32.5%. The remaining % is made up of rented dwellings (plus a negligible % of households living rent-free).

== See also ==
- List of places of worship in Guildford (borough)
