= William Ingalton =

English painter

William Ingalton (1794–1866), was an English painter and builder.

Ingalton was born in 1794, the son of a shoemaker at Worplesdon, Surrey. He lived for a longtime at Eton, where he painted domestic and rustic scenes. From 1816 to 1826 he was a contributor to the Royal Academy and other London exhibitions. In 1821 he published lithographed views of Eton. About 1826 his health broke down, and he ceased to practise as an artist. He became an architect and builder at Windsor, and resided at Clewer. Subsequently, he removed to the Isle of Wight, and died in 1866.
