= Greater London Regional Planning Committee =

Regional urban planning organisation that existed between 1926 and 1936

The Greater London Regional Planning Committee was an organisation created by the London County Council, and was the earliest attempt to create a regional planning governance structure for London.

== History ==
Patrick Abercrombie approached Neville Chamberlain, as Minister of Health, urging him to establish a regional planning committee for the area then known as "Greater London". The committee was appointed in October 1926. It was explicitly empowered by the bylaws of the London County Council to regionally plan.

In January 1929, Raymond Unwin was appointed as "Technical Adviser" to the committee.

Unwin's term was due to extend at the end of 1930, but was extended annually to 31 March 1933, when the committee was reconstituted.

The committee was disbanded in 1936, after the London County Council withdrew its funding for the committee, with the support of the Middlesex County Council.

== Composition ==
It consisted of representatives of the local authorities within an approximate 25 mile radius of central London.

== Recommendations ==
One of the committees recommendations was the creation of a green belt around London, which would become the Metropolitan Green Belt. In 1934, the committee unsuccessfully attempted to attempted to convince HM Treasury, the Air Ministry and the War Office to pay for the Green Belt.
