= Fairlands =

Hamlet in Surrey, England

Coordinates: 51°15′30″N 0°36′58″W

- Hamlet
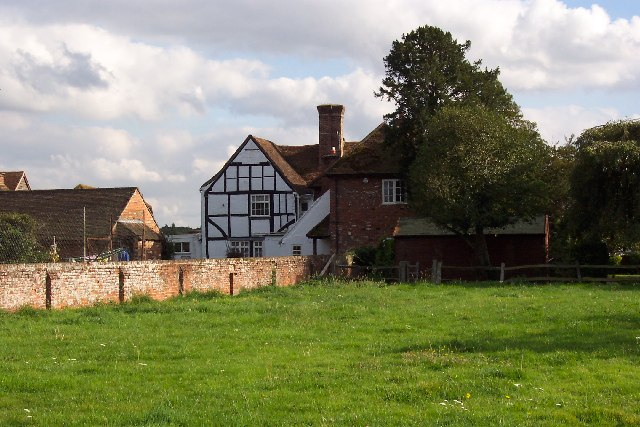
- Fairlands Farm

- Location within Surrey
- Population: 1,444
- OS grid reference: SU964525
- District: Guildford
- Shire county: Surrey
- Region: South East
- Country: England
- Sovereign state: United Kingdom
- Post town: Guildford
- Postcode district: GU3
- Dialling code: 01483
- Police: Surrey
- Fire: Surrey
- Ambulance: South East Coast
- UK Parliament: Guildford

Fairlands is the largest settlement in the civil parish of Worplesdon in the Borough of Guildford, Surrey, England. The neighbourhood is centred 2.6 miles (4.2 km) north-west of Guildford, to which it is linked by a relatively straight road. The arbitrary centre of Worplesdon, a linear settlement, its church, is 1.2 miles (1.9 km) north-east.

== Amenities ==
Fairlands has a parade of eight shops, a post office, a doctor's surgery, primary school, recreation ground and community centre. The latter is used for resident's association meetings, meetings of other groups of cross-sections of the community, and private hire events.

Directly north of Fairlands is Merrist Wood College, which specialises in practical and theoretical landscape-related careers and agricultural vocational courses. The campus encompasses 400 acres (160 ha) of land.

== Residents Association ==
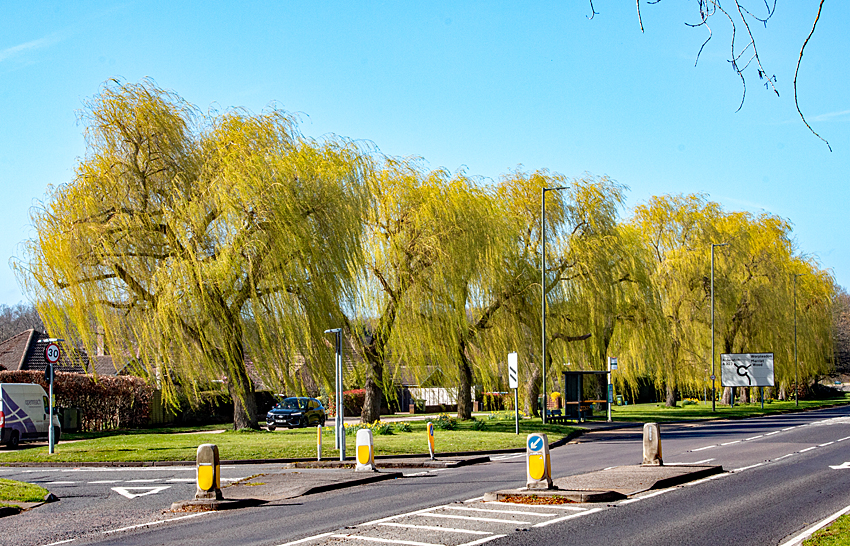
Willows alongside the A323 at Fairlands

The Fairlands, Liddington Hall and Gravetts Lane Community Association (FLGCA) is formed of residents of Fairlands and nearby residential areas. The FLGCA administer the community centre, form an umbrella organisation for various groups specific to the neighbourhoods, and more generally act for the benefit of residents. A free monthly magazine is delivered to every house within its scope.

== Youth outreach ==
The Normandy Youth Center serves the area by sponsoring community-based programs targeting youth in the area (especially marginal groups and minorities) for the purpose of increasing exposure to educational opportunities and building a stronger community.

== History ==
Fairlands and Littlefields Farms, together comprising around 250 acres (100 ha), were sold for development in 1926. Plans for an estate of around 1,000 houses were approved by the borough council in December 1934 and construction began the following year. A second phase of housebuilding began in the late-1950s and Fairlands County Primary School, designed by the architect, Raymond Ash, opened in 1966. The settlement is not bisected by any main roads and continues to reject street lighting. Today 12 residential roads and closes form a clustered hamlet.

== Transport ==
=== Road ===
The A323 Aldershot road adjoins Fairlands and provides an almost straight route from the community to Guildford, merging with the A322 road from Bagshot shortly before the A3's Wooden Bridge interchange. Stagecoach South's route 20 connects Fairlands with Guildford, Ash and Aldershot.

=== Rail ===
Worplesdon railway station, with direct trains to London, is 2.5 miles (4.0 km) north-east. Ash railway station, on the North Downs Line is about 3.5 miles (5.6 km) to the west.
