= Wolley =

Wolley is a surname. Notable people with the surname include:

- Charles Wolley-Dod (1892–1937), British pilot and aviation executive
- Clive Phillipps-Wolley (1853–1918), British-Canadian official, author and big game hunter
- Edward Wolley, Anglican bishop in Ireland in the 17th century
- Elizabeth Wolley (1552–1600), English courtier
- Francis Wolley (1583–1609), son of Queen Elizabeth's Latin secretary, Sir John Wolley, and Elizabeth More
- Hannah Wolley (or Wolley, 1622–c.1675), English writer
- John Wolley (1823–1859), English naturalist
- John Wolley (died 1596), English politician
