= George Abbot School =

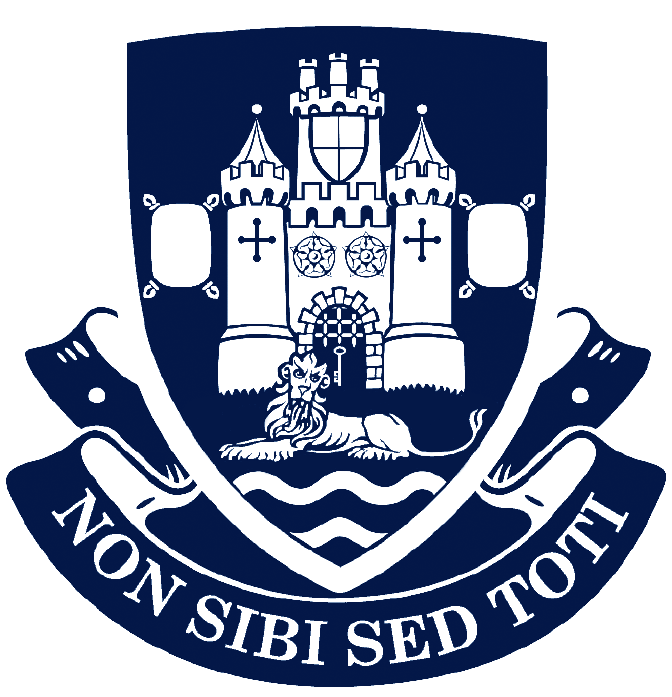

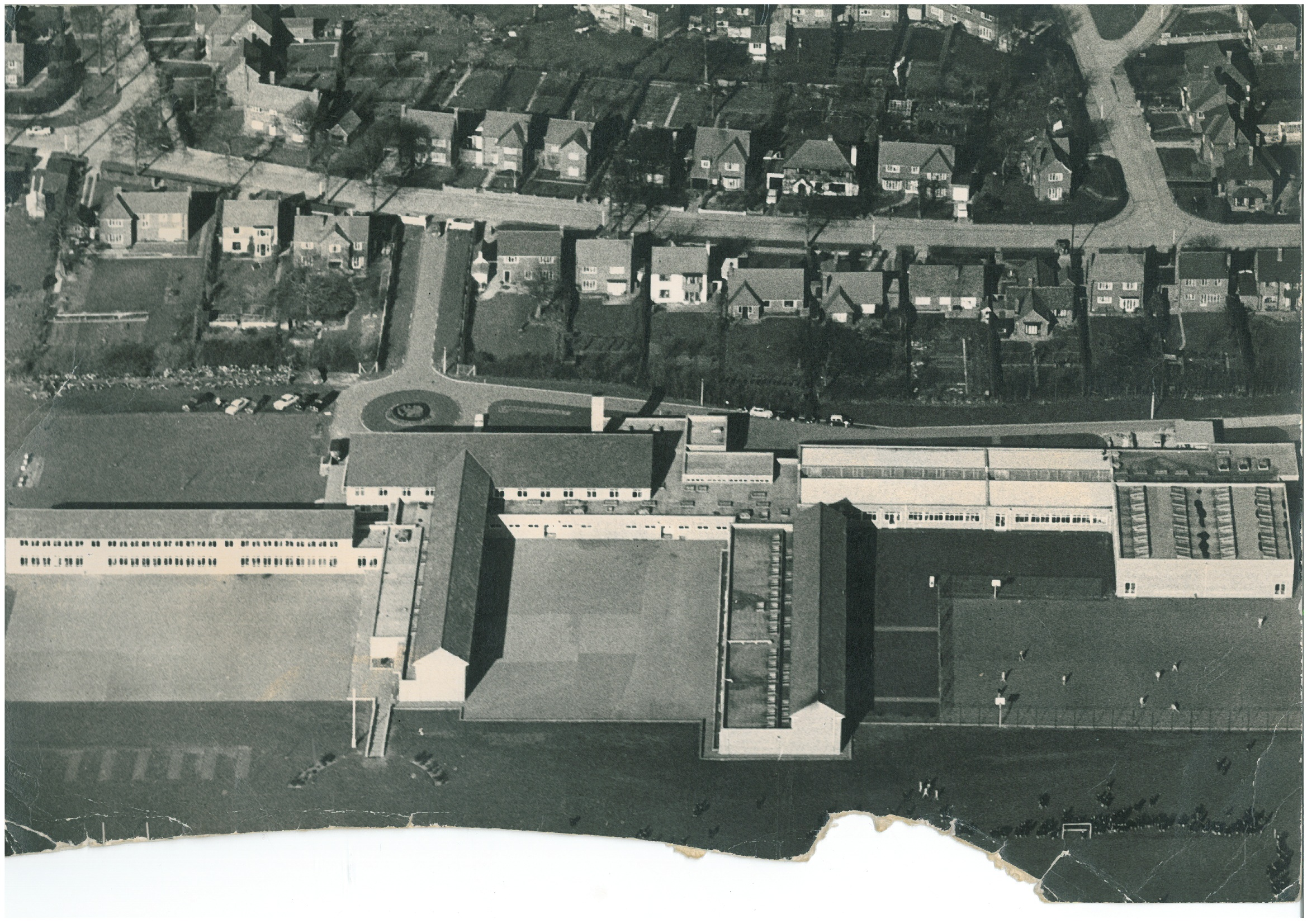
- Aerial View of George Abbot School, c.1960

Location
- Woodruff Avenue; Burpham; Guildford, Surrey, GU1 1XX; England
- 51.254°N 0.548°W

Information
- Type: Academy
- Motto: Non Sibi Sed Toti; Not For Oneself But For All
- Established: 1957
- Department for Education URN: 136906 Tables
- Ofsted: Reports
- Chair of Governors: Trevor Skerritt
- Headteacher: Kate Carriett
- Gender: Coeducational
- Age: 11 to 18
- Enrolment: 1946 as of September 2015
- Capacity: 1932
- Houses: Falcon; Gryphon; Martlet; Wyvern; Phoenix
- Colours: Navy, Gold
- Website: www.georgeabbot.surrey.sch.uk

George Abbot School is a coeducational secondary school and sixth form with academy status in Burpham, north-east of the town centre of Guildford providing a comprehensive education, for around 2,000 young people, aged 11–18.

== History ==
The school is named after the Guildford-native 17th-century Archbishop of Canterbury George Abbot. The two main buildings are Elmslie and Raynham, named after the two headteachers when the buildings were separate schools, Miss Elmslie for girls, and Mr Raynham for boys.

== Curriculum ==
All students must take four GCSE subjects. In Years 7 to 9, students will participate in eight creative/expressive subjects: dance, drama, music, design and technology, photography textiles, graphics and art. During Year 7 students are taught one language of either French, German, or Spanish. Some carry on these languages for GCSE. Other subjects include History, Geography, Sociology and Physical Education.

Students take separate or combined science GCSEs (all involve Chemistry, Physics and Biology). Religious education is taken at Y10. An option exists of taking fast track foreign languages (a year early) so pupils are able to learn another language (Spanish, German, or French) to take two language GCSEs. This option is usually for native speakers.

== Sixth Form ==
George Abbot has a Sixth Form with nearly 500 students. It offers a choice of over 40 subjects at A level and BTEC, GCSE re-take options and enrichment courses. Facilities include a Sixth Form Centre, artificial pitch and sports fields, a Fitness Suite and a common room.

== Notable former pupils ==
=== Sport ===
- Alex McCarthy, Premier League goalkeeper
- Ashley Giles MBE, cricketer
- Georgina Hermitage, paralympic sprinter
- Liam Heath, canoeist and Olympic gold medallist
- Matt Jarvis, professional footballer
- Rachel Cawthorn, Olympic canoeist

=== Music ===
- John Renbourn, folk guitarist and former member of Pentangle

=== Film/TV ===
- Ellie Wallwork, actress
