= Wood Street Village =

Village in Surrey, England

Coordinates: 51°15′11″N 0°38′28″W

- Village
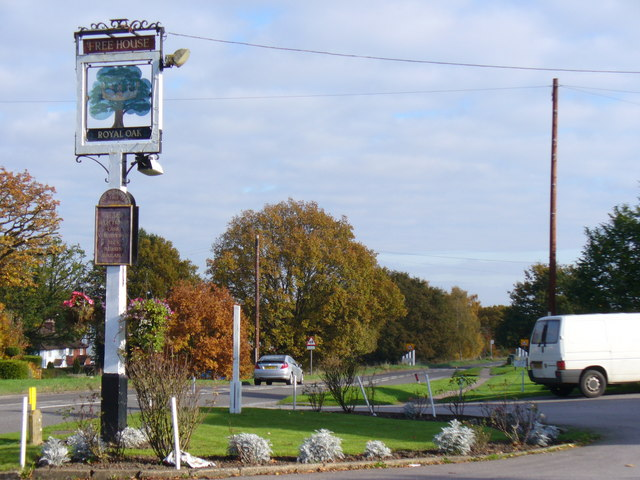
- Small part of the green, main thoroughfare and pub sign

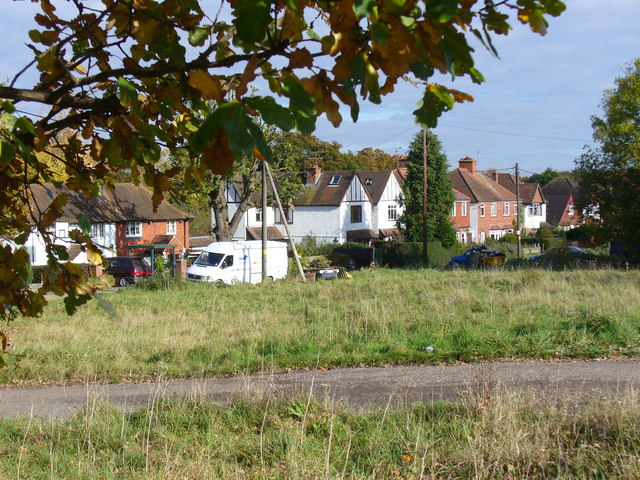
- Housing in the village

- Location within Surrey
- Population: 1,802
- OS grid reference: SU9551
- Civil parish: Worplesdon
- District: Guildford
- Shire county: Surrey
- Region: South East
- Country: England
- Sovereign state: United Kingdom
- Post town: Guildford
- Postcode district: GU3
- Dialling code: 01483
- Police: Surrey
- Fire: Surrey
- Ambulance: South East Coast
- UK Parliament: Guildford

Wood Street Village is a clustered and linear village in Surrey, England with a village green, buffered by Metropolitan Green Belt on all sides. It is centred 3 miles (4.8 km) west of Guildford and is part of the civil parish of Worplesdon (where the 2011 Census population was included), as well as continuing to be served semi-dependently as a chapelry of the Church of England.

== History ==
The earliest known settlement in the area was a Roman villa, dating to the third century, on the extreme eastern edge of the village, discovered in 1824. The find was unexpected as it is a long way from the nearest Roman settlement and on poor land for arable farming. In the medieval period the area was part of the Windsor Forest. Known as Guildford Park, it was hunting grounds for the King when he was in residence at Windsor Castle. From around the 14th Century, sheep farming became the main occupation in the area.

There are a large minority of pre-20th century houses in the village; Wood Street Village has farmhouses which date from the 15th and 16th centuries. Littlefield Manor, in the mid-category of architectural listing Grade II* joins with neighbouring Whipley Manor as one of two similarly sized farms, but which were once larger manors, the history of which is well documented by its many returns such as the Feet of Fines kept by the central government. Historically these records were kept at the Palace of Westminster but today are held at the National Archives (UK) and their contents are summarised in such works as the Victoria County History.

Wood Street School opened in 1878 and the Victorian part still stands.

== Industry ==
In 1896, Arthur Drummond, artist and keen model engineer who lived at Pinks Hill in the village, wanted a small lathe for modelling purposes. Unable to find what he wanted he designed and built his own. He and his brother formed Drummond Engineering and started making lathes in their workshop and soon built up an extensive export trade. The outbreak of World War I brought large government orders for small lathes for use on destroyers and submarines as well as larger lathes for use by the Army Service Corps. In the inter-war period and during World War II Drummond Engineering supplied lathes to vehicle and aircraft manufacturing companies. The company finally closed in 1981.

== Geography ==
The village is nucleated in layout but with a linear part to the north-west and east and more than half of its land consists of cultivated fields or woodland, in the south and along the banks of its two main brooks, which flow north to eventually join the River Wey. The centre of Guildford is 3 miles (4.8 km) to the east.

Elevations and soil

Elevations range from 67 metres (220 ft) in the north and west to 38 metres (125 ft) Above Ordnance Datum (sea level) in the far north. The soil is rich in humus with a mixed subsoil of clay and loamy soil interspersed with small amounts of sandier soil in the uninhabited highest patches.

== Amenities ==
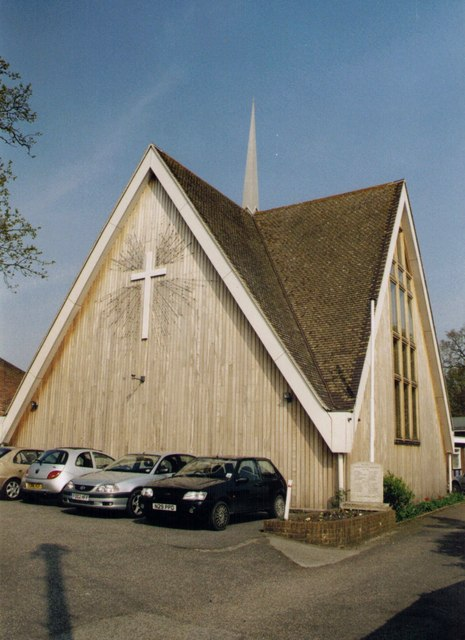
The single place of worship in the village was built in 1967 to a very tall single-storey gable end roof design

The village green features the only surviving maypole in Surrey. The current one was erected in 1953 to commemorate the Coronation of Elizabeth II, replacing its 1871 predecessor. The green hosts late spring and summer fairs.

Wood Street Village's amenities include a church, infant school, auto repair garage, and a post office. There are two public houses, the Royal Oak and the White Hart. Both were previously closed whilst waiting new tenants. However, the White Hart reopened in September 2026.

The St Albans chapel was completed in 1967.

Nearby sports teams are Normandy and Normandy Reserves F.C. who play in the Aldershot & District Football League.
