= Worplesdon railway station =

Railway station in Surrey, England

Coordinates: 51.289°N 0.583°W

Worplesdon
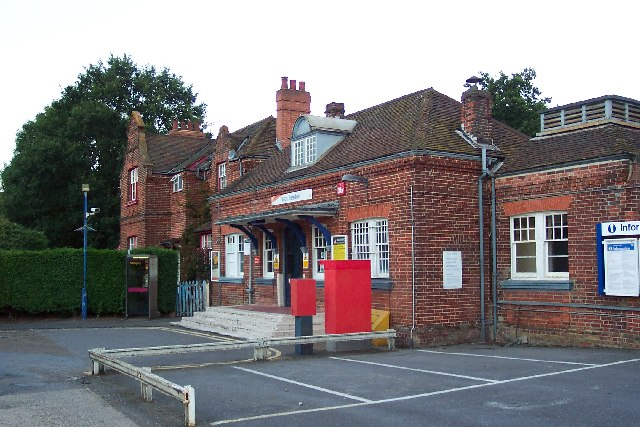

General information
- Location: Prey Heath, Woking; England
- Grid reference: SU989552
- Manager: South Western Railway
- Platforms: 2

Other information
- Station code: WPL
- Classification: DfT category E

History
- Opened: 1 March 1883

Passengers
- 2020/21: ▼37,652
- 2021/22: ▲0.101 million
- 2022/23: ▲0.109 million
- 2023/24: ▲0.129 million
- 2024/25: ▲0.142 million
Location
Notes
- Passenger statistics from the Office of Rail and Road

Worplesdon railway station is a railway station in the Woking district of Surrey, England. The station is located between Woking and Guildford stations on the Portsmouth Direct Line, 26 miles 55 chains (42.9 km) down the line from London Waterloo.

== History ==
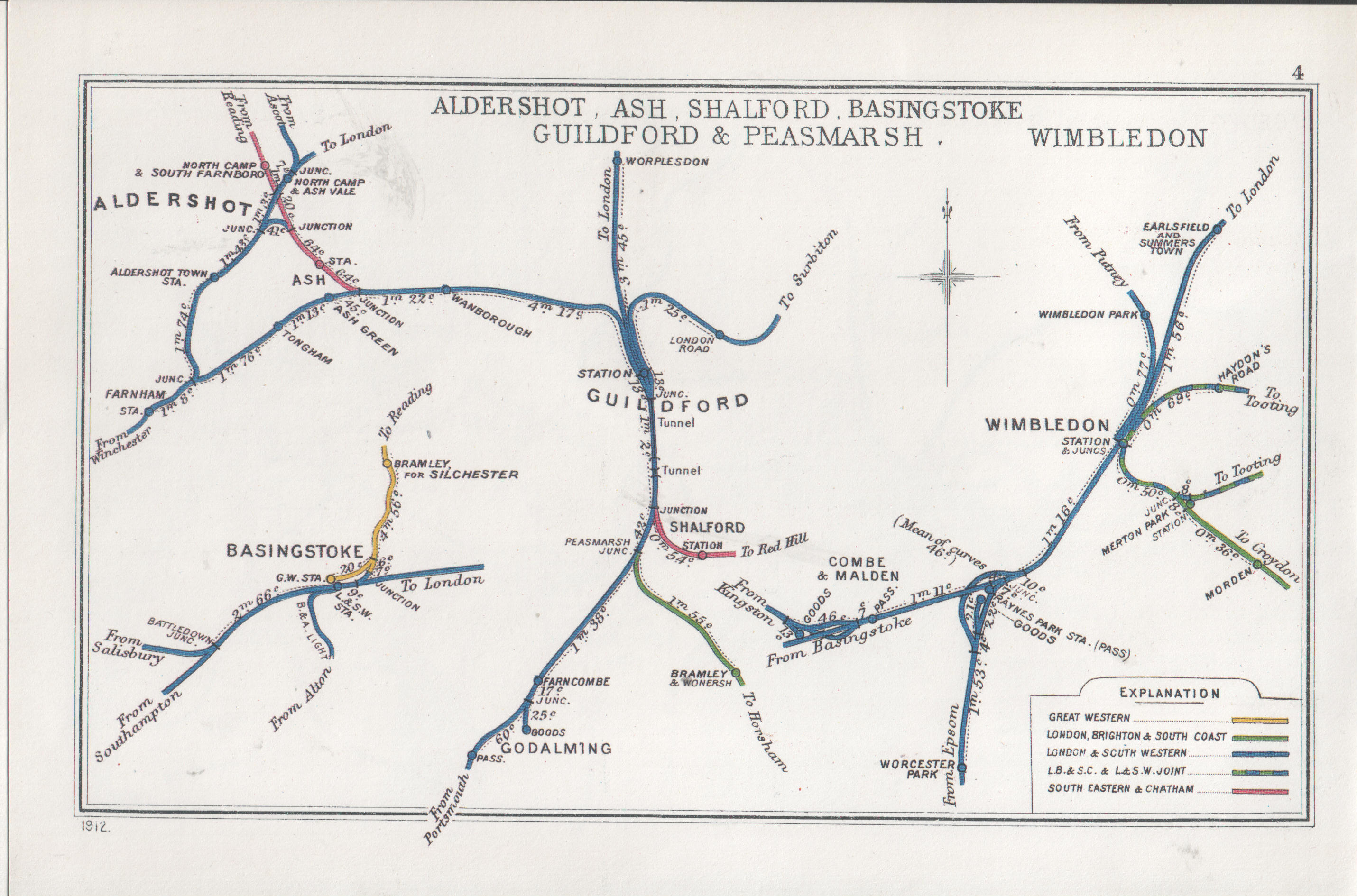
A 1912 Railway Clearing House map of lines around Worplesdon railway station

The station opened in 1883, surrounded by open heath and farmland. Some nearby land has subsequently been developed and the station is currently situated in an area of affluent low-density housing. When it opened it was served by ten trains southbound towards Guildford, and nine trains northbound towards London each day.

In Autumn 2016, the station's signage was changed to Tarrytown during filming for The Commuter.

== Location ==
Despite its name, the station is not located in Worplesdon village, which is approximately 1.5 miles (2.4 km) to the southwest. The nearest village to the station is Mayford, located approximately 1 mile (1.6 km) north-northeast of the station.

== Services ==
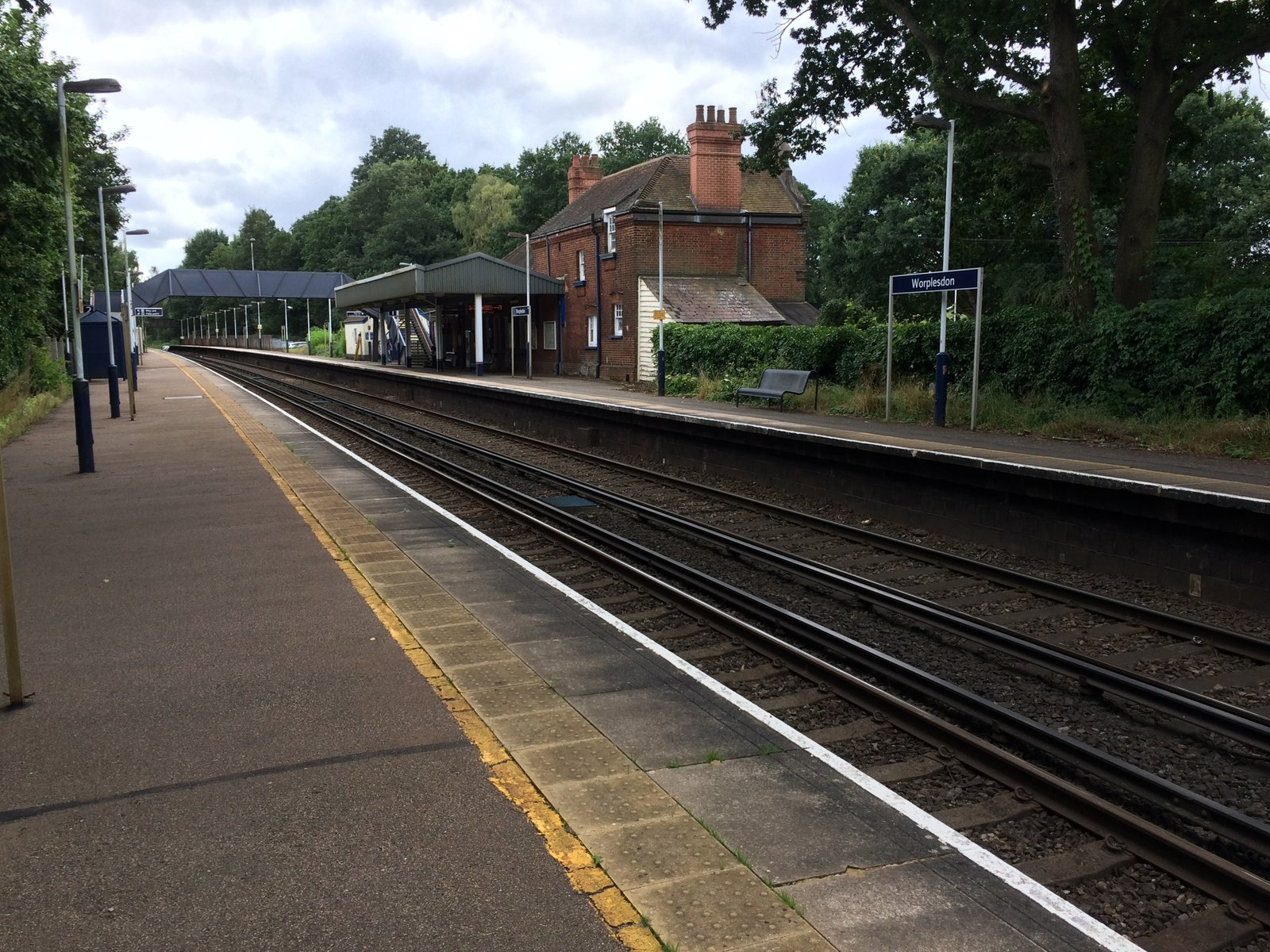
The station seen in 2016, looking south

On Mondays to Fridays, there is typically an hourly service in each direction, to Haslemere and London Waterloo. Sunday services began at this station at the start of 2020, with one train per hour on the Guildford - Waterloo (via Woking) suburban service calling here.

The ticket office is only open during the morning peak on weekdays; there is a self-service ticket machine for purchase of tickets at other times. The station has a car park and cycle rack.

| Preceding station | National Rail | Following station |
|---|---|---|
| Woking | South Western Railway; Portsmouth Direct Line | Guildford |
