= Wanborough, Surrey =

Village and parish in Surrey, England

Coordinates: 51°13′52″N 0°39′43″W

Wanborough
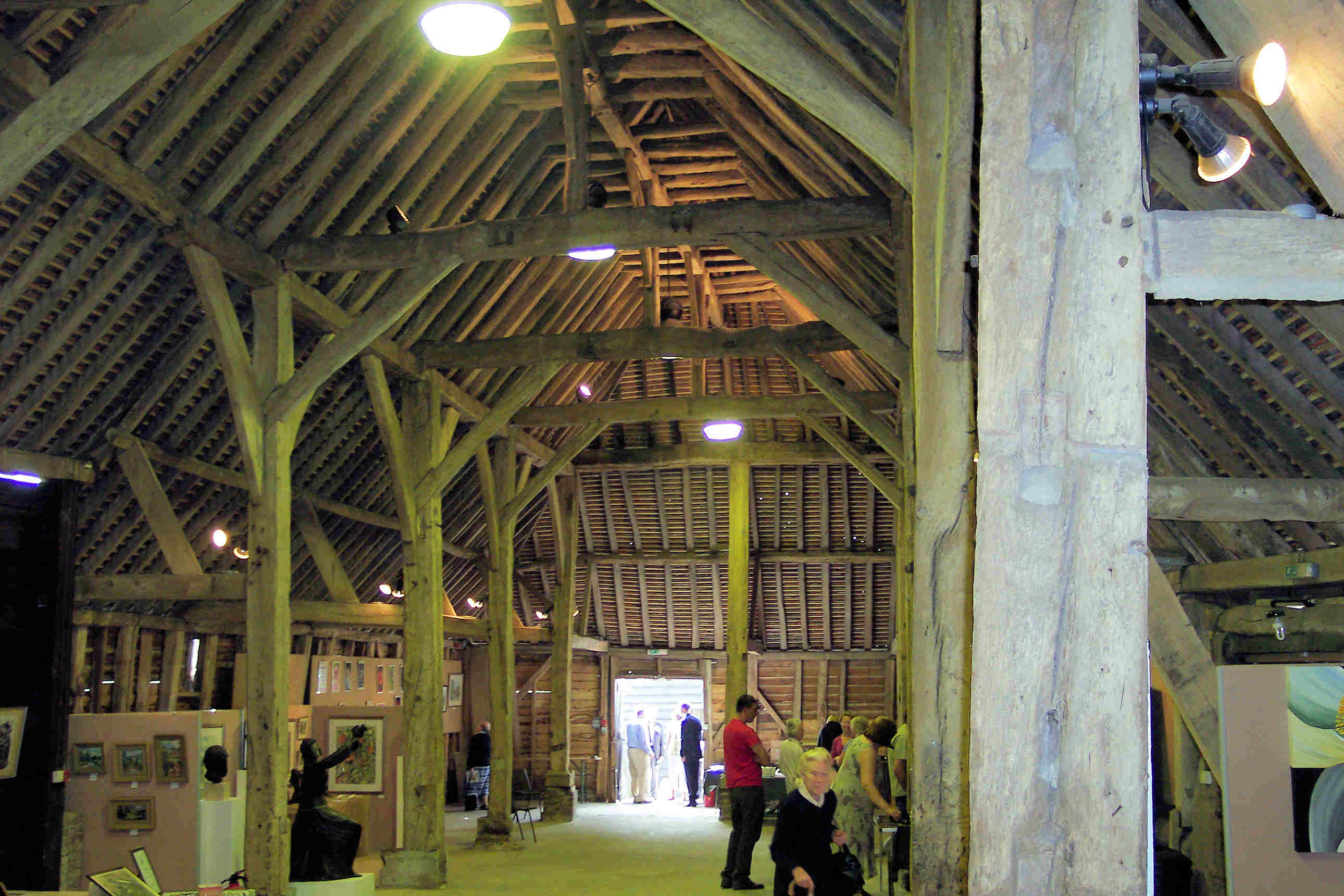
- The interior of the Great Barn, Wanborough

- Location within Surrey
- Area: 7.57 km^{2} (2.92 sq mi)
- Population: 335 (Civil Parish 2011)
  - Density: 44/km^{2} (110/sq mi)
- OS grid reference: SU934489
- District: Guildford
- Shire county: Surrey
- Region: South East
- Country: England
- Sovereign state: United Kingdom
- Post town: Guildford
- Postcode district: GU3
- Dialling code: 01483
- Police: Surrey
- Fire: Surrey
- Ambulance: South East Coast
- UK Parliament: Godalming and Ash

Wanborough (/ˈwɒnbərə/) is a rural village and civil parish in Surrey approximately 4 miles (6 km) west of Guildford on the northern slopes of the Hog's Back. Wanborough lies between Puttenham and Normandy. Wanborough village grew around and to service Wanborough Manor which is on the site of ancient springs.

== History ==
=== Prehistory ===
According to a local publication Wanborough and its Church, humans in prehistory travelled along the Hog's Back, attracted by the spring in the locality. The earliest settlement dates to 8000 BC.

The "Wanborough Coins" are part of a votive offering deposited at a Romano-Celtic temple (i.e., late 1st century BC to 4th century AD); this site was looted between 1983 and 1985, but over one thousand silver coins, a small part of the original assemblage, were eventually added to the collection of the British Museum. The British Museum calls the destruction of the Romano-Celtic temple at Wanborough in Surrey 'one of the saddest stories in British archaeology'.

A headdress and sceptre handles were also recovered. These were probably used by a priest during rituals. Subsequent excavations have shown that there were in fact two temples on the site. A circular temple had been built during the late first century BC, replaced in the second century AD by a square temple.

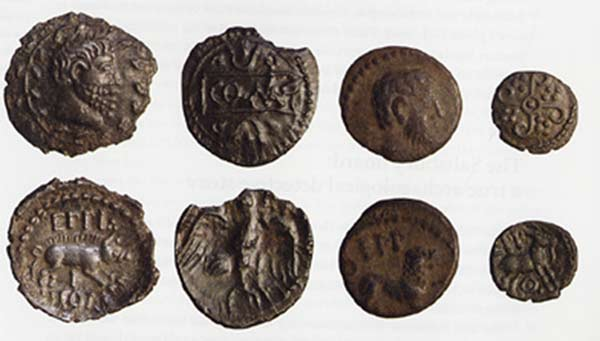
The Wanborough coins, discovered in 1983

The Saxon name of Wenberge means bump-barrow; this barrow was on the southern border of Wanborough on the top of the Hog's Back.

=== Pre-dissolution ===
Wanborough appears in Domesday Book of 1086 as Weneberge held by Goisfrid (Geoffrey) de Mandville. Its assets were: 3 hides; 1 church, 9 ploughs, 6 acres (2.4 ha) of meadow, woodland worth 30 hogs (per year). Its people rendered £7 per year to their overlords. It also states that it had been held before the Norman Conquest by two thegns, Sweign and Leofwin, who may have been brothers of King Harold.

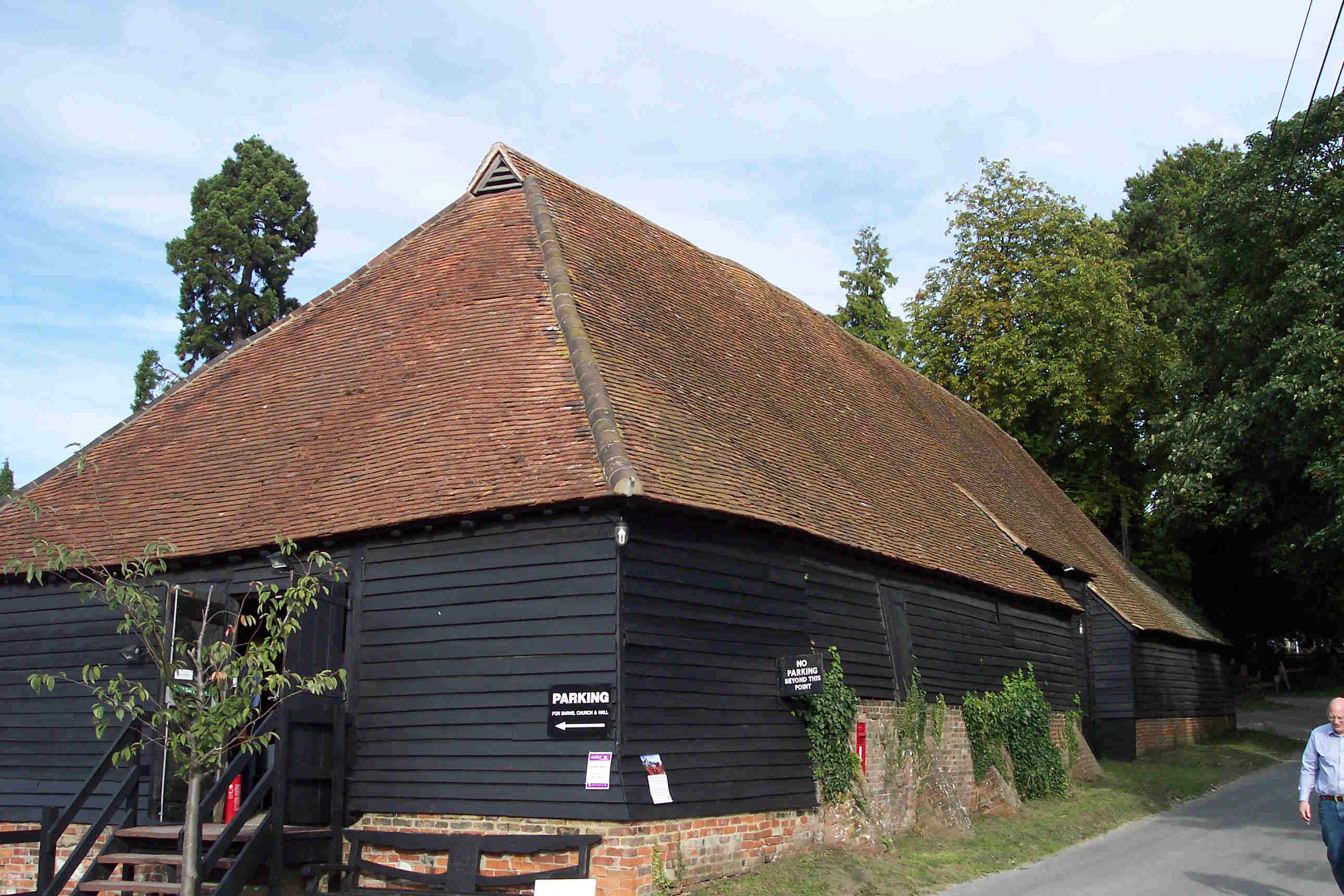
The exterior of the Great Barn.

In 1130 the Manor was sold to Waverley Abbey for £80 and put to use in great part to farm sheep to feed, clothe and endow the Cistercian community. The present Great Barn was built in 1388 and was used for storing and processing crops (threshing and winnowing). Having been built for the Cistercian Abbey, the barn was not a tithe barn as it would have stored the entire manor crop. The barn is made from massive oak timbers and is an aisled barn with large doors on either long side to permit entry by carts. It was extended in 1705. The dates have been obtained using tree-ring dating techniques.

In 1511 the Abbey obtained the right to hold an annual fair at Wanborough for 3 days from 23 August. By 1536 the fair was making £35 for the abbey and had a pie poudre court to try trading offences.

=== Post-dissolution ===
In 1536, Waverley Abbey was dissolved and the manor passed into secular ownership. St Bartholomew's Church was in regular use until at least 1675. By 1794, as leaseholder, the Quaker, Morris Birkbeck was farming an estate of 1,500 acres (610 ha) at Wanborough, where he joined others in England and France who were experimenting with crossbreeding Merino sheep and innovating with modern techniques. He used the church as a wood store and barn.

In 1613, a court case recorded that someone was assaulted with a "cricket staffe" (an early term for the cricket bat) at Wanborough.

The present manor house was built, starting in about 1670, by Thomas Dalmahoy, who was MP for Guildford for most of the reign of the restored monarch, Charles II.

From 1880, Sir Algernon West lived at Wanborough Manor. He was Principal Private Secretary to Prime Minister W. E. Gladstone. West entertained many political figures at the manor, including Gladstone, Queen Victoria and Bismarck. He was also a director of the South Eastern Railway and was responsible for the opening of Wanborough Station (in nearby Normandy) in 1891. In 1900, the manor passed to Asquith who lived there until he became prime minister. In 1908 West returned and stayed until his death in 1921. The Manor passed to the Perkins family who introduced one of the first combine harvesters in the country.

=== World War II ===
During World War II the Manor was used as a training centre for Special Operations Executive agents. The manor was designated Special Training School 5, and handled the first three phases of agent training. It operated from spring 1941 to March 1943 under the command of Major Roger de Wesselow, who had been a Coldstream Guards officer in World War I. Many agents in 'Section F' (France) passed through STS5 and courses lasted 3 weeks. Each course was specific to one country and all conversation during the course was in the target language. Trainees were taught theoretical and practical subjects including physical training, shooting, explosives, sabotage, map-reading, Morse code, and observation skills. Among the 130 agents trained at Wanborough were Peter Churchill and Noor Inayat Khan.

One of the tests in the course was to invite beautiful women to seduce the agents through alcohol and flirtation and try to get them to divulge secrets. But the test was dropped, as almost all the agents appear to have failed to keep sensitive information to themselves.

=== Post-war ===
In the 1950s the Manor became a country club and restaurant. It acquired a reputation amongst the taxi drivers of Guildford who would be called to collect girls from Guildford station at weekends and then drive them back for an early train up to London on Monday morning.

The Manor House is now split into three private dwellings.

Since the 1960s development has been constrained by its rural isolation and protected status of much of its land, Wanborough has gradually become a mixture of a commuter and retirement settlement. Principal employment areas are the Aldershot Urban Area, Guildford and London.

== St Bartholomew's Church ==
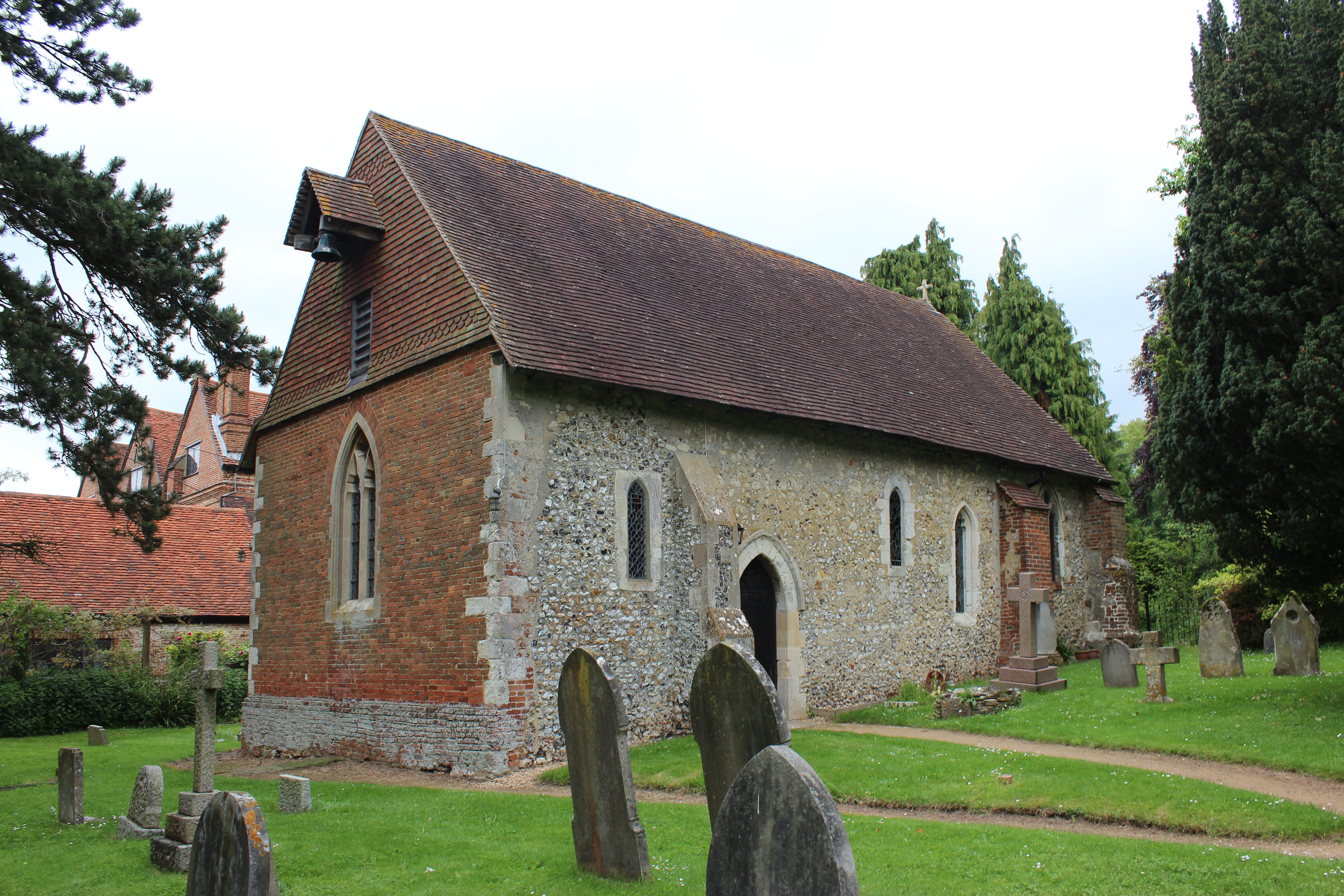
St Bartholomew's Church

The village church is small, only 13.5 m (44 ft) by 5.5 m (18 ft) internally. It was originally built around 1060 replacing an earlier wooden Saxon church. It was rebuilt in the 13th century. In Victorian times, whilst nearby Puttenham church was closed for repairs, the rector of Puttenham, the Rev. W A Duckworth, decided to hold services in Wanborough's church. He arranged and paid for the restoration of St Bartholomew's by architect Henry Woodyer. It was rededicated in 1861. Thus the various walls and windows have significantly different heritage. The Victorian west brick wall now supports an external bell. The church's architectural importance is reflected in its Grade I listing.

== Demography and housing ==
2011 Census Homes
Output area	Detached	Semi-detached	Terraced	Flats and apartments	Caravans/temporary/mobile homes	shared between households
(Civil Parish)	74	31	12	5	0	0

The average level of accommodation in the region composed of detached houses was 28%, the average that was apartments was 22.6%.

2011 Census Key Statistics
Output area	Population	Households	% Owned outright	% Owned with a loan	hectares
(Civil Parish)	335	122	55.7%	32.8%	757

The proportion of households in the civil parish who owned their home outright compares to the regional average of 35.1%. The proportion who owned their home with a loan compares to the regional average of 32.5%. The remaining % is made up of rented dwellings (plus a negligible % of households living rent-free).

== Transport links ==
The nearest railway station is Wanborough in the large, generally 20th century, neighbourhood of Flexford, 1.3 mi (2.1 km) to the north, served by South Western Railway, who manage the station, and by Great Western Railway. It is on the Ascot to Guildford section of the North Downs Line.

The through road in the village leads south towards the edge of the village where there is an intersection with the A31 dual carriageway that runs along the top of the Hog's Back.

The only bus service is a once a day school bus, operated by Carlone, connecting the village to the Broadwater School in Farncombe.
