= Whitmoor Common =

Nature preserve in England

Coordinates: 51.273°N 0.591°W

- Site of Special Scientific Interest
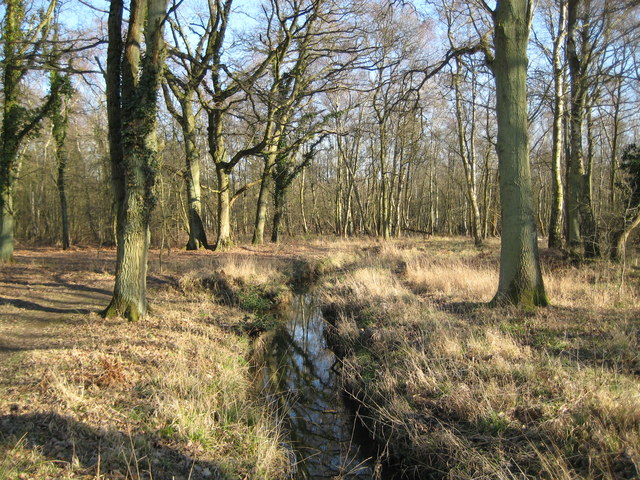
- Location of Whitmoor Common.
- Area of search: Surrey
- Grid reference: SU 984 536
- Interest: Biological
- Area: 166.0 hectares (410 acres)
- Notification date: 1993
- Location map: Magic Map

Whitmoor Common is a 166-hectare (410-acre) biological Site of Special Scientific Interest on the northern outskirts of Guildford in Surrey. It is part of the Thames Basin Heaths Special Protection Area and the 184.9-hectare (457-acre) Whitmoor and Rickford Commons Local Nature Reserve, which is owned by Surrey County Council and managed by the Surrey Wildlife Trust.

This site on the heath of the London Basin has a variety of heathland habitats, as well as areas of woodland, meadow and still and running water. The heath has a nationally scarce spider, Oxyopes heterophthalmus and beetle Hyperaspis pseudopustulata and there are nationally important populations of several bird species.

The site is open to the public.

== History ==
The common has had many fires including 21 June 2018, 22 April 2019, 12 August 2020, 2 July 2026 and 6 July 2026. Some of these fires have been attributed to disgarded rubbish such as glass and cigarette ends. This site remains a high-risk area for wildfires during summer heatwaves.
