= Worplesdon =

Village in Surrey, England

Coordinates: 51°16′19″N 0°36′43″W

- Village and civil parish
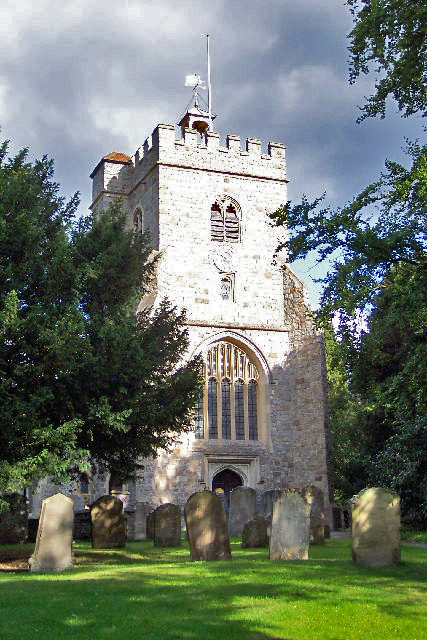
- St Mary's Church; Grade I architectural listing

- Location within Surrey
- Area: 17.94 km^{2} (6.93 sq mi)
- Population: 8,529 (Civil Parish 2011); 1,503 (village and closest neighbourhoods only in 2001)
  - Density: 475/km^{2} (1,230/sq mi)
- OS grid reference: SU9753
- Civil parish: Worplesdon
- District: Borough of Guildford
- Shire county: Surrey
- Region: South East
- Country: England
- Sovereign state: United Kingdom
- Post town: GUILDFORD
- Postcode district: GU3
- Dialling code: 01483
- Police: Surrey
- Fire: Surrey
- Ambulance: South East Coast
- UK Parliament: Guildford

Worplesdon is a village in Surrey, England; it lies 3.1 miles (5.0 km) north-north-west of Guildford. It is a large dispersed civil parish that includes the settlements of Worplesdon itself (including its central church area, Perry Hill), Fairlands, Jacobs Well, Rydeshill and Wood Street Village. Its area includes Whitmoor Common.

== History ==
=== Early history ===
South of Broad Street and east of Wood Street Village, on a farm in Broad Street Common, are ruins of a Roman Villa.

Worplesdon has a Grade I C of E church, St Mary's with a 13th-century chancel and later additions. Worplesdon's single manor appears in Domesday Book of 1086 as Werpesdune held by Turald (Thorold) from Roger de Montgomery. Its domesday assets were: 6½ hides; a church, 9 ploughs, a mill worth 2s 6d, 8 acres (3.2 ha) of meadow, wood worth 60 hogs. Its 22 households (of which one was a serf's) rendered £10 sterling per year to its overlords.

Early manorial owners includes (all cited as "de..."): Basseville, Holeye, (13th century) Wykford, Wintershall/Wintershull, Seymour (14th century); Ditton, Hegham, Wykford. Then we see Jasper Tudor (Earl of Pembroke, then created the Duke of Bedford) who was attainted, however following Edward IV's grant to the Duke of Clarence in 1474, it reverted to the last Duke of Bedford of the medieval creation (who died, childless).

Sir Anthony Browne and his son, Anthony Browne, 1st Viscount Montagu, gained a royal lease of the manor in the Tudor period, followed by Lord Annandale in 1625 for three lifetimes. The Harbord family next held it followed by John Payne of Hurtmore and Thomas Newton of Stoke (next Guildford) who owned it in 1670. Its owners until 1911 acquired what remained of the estate as early as in 1681, the Onslow family, historically Earls of Surrey.

The parish was divided into four tithings: Perry Hill, about the hill on which the church stands; Burpham, on the east side; West End; and Wyke. The last, which was separated from the rest of the parish, was added to Ash in 1890.

==== Later Manors ====
Frenches

The reputed and lost Frenches manor represented the knight's fee held there by Richard le French in 1349. In 1402, John French released the manor of Frenches to Robert Oyldesborough, brewer, of London, having briefly been held by William Hamonde, probably in trust and passed to Robert Russell in 1598. It is probably represented by Russell Place Farm. Anthony Russell was living in Worplesdon when Symmes wrote, about 1676.

Merist Wood

In 1582, the Queen, by charter, granted a lease to George More of Loseley of Merest Wood described as 82 acres (33 ha) of wood and wooded ground in the Forest of Windsor, in Worplesdon at £3 8s. per annum. In 1742, a related fine (lease premium) for this was sued for among two men of the Grenville family.

Wyke

In 1279, William of Wyke was holding this westerly manor. Divided between descendants Katerina, Joan and Christine in 1353, under the legal principle of female inheritance, "in moieties". Part holders' surnames thereafter included: Logge, Osbaldeston, Harding, Parker, Manory, Vyne, White in 1580; in 1584, sold outright to William Harding, who thus acquired the whole again. Henceforth it descended with the manor of Claygate in Ash, Surrey.

=== Post-Industrial Revolution ===
Adjacent to the church, a London to Portsmouth semaphore tower (now demolished) served in the Napoleonic Wars. The east window of the church was embellished with stained glass, collected and arranged in 1802, at the expense of the Rev. W. Roberts; by the 1840s, the whole parish's population was 1,424, which then included Burpham and Wyke.

In 1911, the Victoria County History's guide to the area included the agricultural and economic description:

The village and church stand upon an abrupt hill of Bagshot sand (the Bracklesham Beds), but round it the soil is lower Bagshot sand. To the south the parish is on the London Clay...There are brick and tile works, and cement works in the parish, and nursery gardens. It is otherwise agricultural and a great part of it is waste land. Whitmoor and Broad Street Commons are extensive wastes.

This pinpoints the area's sands, and hence its low agricultural natural fertility, as being key to Worpledon's abundance of heath and woodlands. In traditional parish descriptions such unproductive land is described as "waste".

In the 2021 Census, the parish was given an estimated population of 8,500, which is almost identical to the 2011 census figure.

== Governance ==
=== Surrey County Council ===
There is one representative on Surrey County Council, Conservative Keith Witham; this large ward extends into Normandy.

=== Guildford Borough Council ===
There are three representatives on Guildford Borough Council:

Last elected	Member	Ward
2023	Bill Akhtar	Worplesdon
2023	Honor Brooker	Worplesdon
2023	Philip Brooker	Worplesdon

Worplesdon Parish Council

Type
- Type: Parish council

Leadership
- Chairman: Councillor Nigel Mitchell

Elections
- Last election: 2023
- Next election: 2027

Meeting place
- Unit 2 Saxton, Parklands, Railton Road, Guildford, Surrey, GU2 9JX

Website
- https://worplesdon-pc.gov.uk/

=== Worplesdon Parish Council ===
Worplesdon Parish Council was constituted in 1894. The parish council is made up of 16 councillors and is split into four local wards which include:

- Fairlands
- Jacobs Well
- Perry Hill
- Wood Street Village

The last election of parish councillors was in 2023 and all were elected without contest.

== Landmarks ==
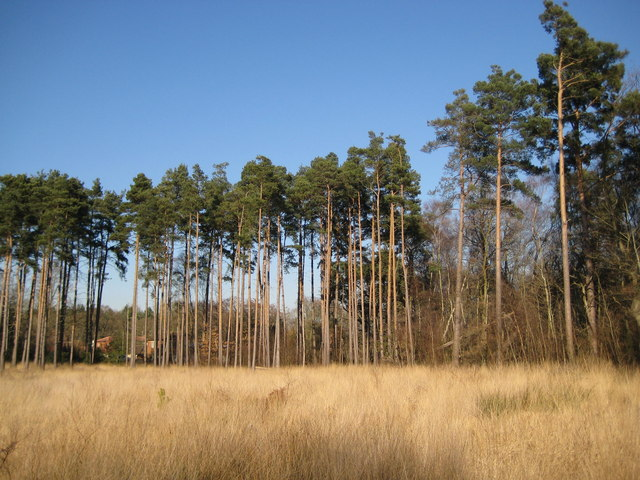
Whitmoor Common

=== Whitmoor Common ===
A large common is at the heart of the parish that has mixed landscapes of heather, copses of woodland, grasslands and bracken.

Clustered around the village centre and its lightly developed localities are heavily wooded commons, managed by Surrey Wildlife Trust, including Broadstreet & Backside Commons, Stringer's Common, Littlefield Common, Whitmoor/Whitmore Common, Jordan Hill, Rickford Common and Chitty's Common.

=== Memorial hall and recreational grounds ===
Worplesdon is served by the Worplesdon Memorial Hall, built in 1922 to recall those who died in World War I; it and the adjacent recreation grounds are managed by trustees representing the donors and the Parish Council. Beside the Hall are a playground, and tennis and cricket facilities. There are a large events room, a meeting room and the Sidney Sime Memorial Gallery.

== Amenities ==
Worplesdon itself has few shopping facilities; however, Worplesdon Place Hotel is located nearby.

Wood Street Village is, unusually, a larger "village" within the historic parish as well as the 19th-century created, civil parish. Stoughton, Guildford has a diverse parade of shops and is well-situated for access from most of the village and other settlements.

== Transport ==
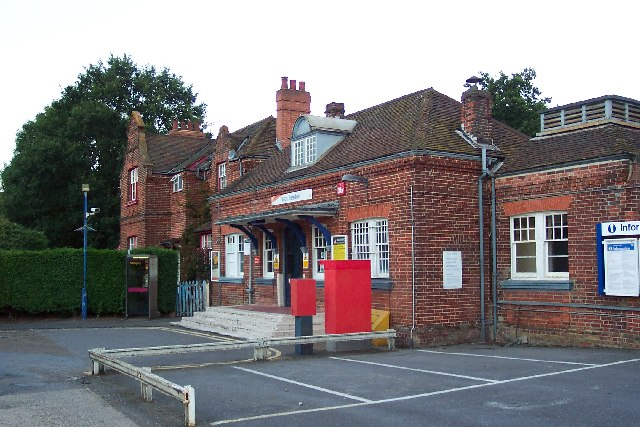
Worplesdon railway station

South Western Railway operates a typically hourly service in each direction between London Waterloo and Guildford from Worplesdon railway station. Most southbound services continue to Haslemere or Portsmouth Harbour.

== Economy ==
Within the parish, 213 people at the time of the last census were employed in finance and insurance industries. Despite the heathland covering the parish, only 0.8% of residents in 2011 were employed in quarrying, forestry and agriculture, similarly real estate accounted for 1.2% of residents' occupations. Technical/scientific employers employed 10% of the population, bolstered by the University of Surrey and Institute for Animal Health (with associated major employers in life sciences, space exploration and computing).

Education employed 12% of the population (549 people). Wholesale and retail trade, and the sale/repair of motor vehicles was the most important single category with 639 people. Health and social work employed 495 people. Accommodation and food service activities, combined with the category of arts, entertainment and recreation, employed a similar figure of 440 people.

Two neighbouring villages to the north-west are Pirbright and Deepcut with significant British Army presences, although the latter's barracks has been redeveloped into homes. Public Administration and Defence; Compulsory Social Security's total of people was 38 fewer than manufacturing, which gave employment to 239 people in 2011.

== Demography, Housing and Religion ==
2011 Census Homes
Output area	Detached	Semi-detached	Terraced	Flats and apartments	Caravans/temporary/mobile homes	shared between households
(Civil Parish)	1,082	1,395	572	346	60	1

The average level of accommodation in the region comprising detached houses was 28%; the average comprising apartments was 22.6%.

2011 Census Key Statistics
Output area	Population	Households	% Owned outright	% Owned with a loan	hectares
(Civil Parish)	8,529	3,456	40.5%	37.2%	1,794

The proportion of households in the civil parish who owned their home outright compares to the regional average of 35.1%. The proportion who owned their home with a loan compares to the regional average of 32.5%. The remaining % is made up of rented dwellings, plus a negligible percentage of households living rent-free.

In the 2021 census, it was found that 88.2% of residents live in a house or bungalow, which is 10.8% higher than the national average; 10% of residents live in a flat or maisonette, 12.2% lower than the national average, and 1.7% live in a caravan or mobile home.

83% of residents were born in the UK and 17% were not, which is on a par with the average for England.

The religious make-up of the parish population is as follows:

2021 Census Religion Data
Religion	Christianity	Islam	Hinduism	Sikhism	Judaism	Irreligious	Other Religion	Did Not Answer
Percentage	53.6	1.5	1.2	0.2	0.2	35.8	0.3	6.5

== Education ==
Merrist Wood Agricultural College stands on the hill in the west of the village, encompassing:

- A wood and pond
- Plant nursery
- Arboriculture training area
- Equestrian centre
- Golf course
- Mixed farm

The village's Perry Hill School closed in 1976, to be replaced by Worplesdon Primary in Fairlands. It caters for 539 students from the ages of 4–11.

=== Youth outreach ===
The Normandy Youth Centre serves the area by sponsoring community-based programmes targeting youth in the area (especially marginal groups and minorities) for the purpose of increasing exposure to educational opportunities and building a stronger community.

== Sport ==
=== Cricket ===
The Worplesdon and Burpham Cricket Club traces its origins to 1890, and Worplesdon & Burpham CC was established in 1999, following the merger of Worplesdon CC and Burpham CC.

Two teams play on Saturday in the Fullers Brewery Surrey County League and one team play on Sunday in the Village League. A new pavilion was opened in 2008, providing much larger facilities.

=== Football ===
Worplesdon Phoenix FC plays in the Surrey Counties Intermediate League and Guildford & Woking Alliance League. Worplesdon Rangers FC was founded in 2001 and caters for pre-reception to under-18 age groups playing in the Surrey Primary League.

=== Tennis ===
Worplesdon Tennis Club is based in the village.

== Notable residents ==
- Thomas Comber, Master of Trinity College, Cambridge, rector of Worplesdon (1615–42)
- William Ingalton (1794–1866), painter and builder
- Stephen Smith, early Quaker, gave Friends' Burial Ground (buried there 1672) (sold 1852).
- John Burton, founding trustee for the colony of Georgia, theologian and rector of Worplesdon (1766–71).
- Sir J. L. Walker, CIE of Worplesdon Place (1911);

In the early 20th century, Worplesdon was home to the artist Sidney Sime, best known for magazine illustration and work in the books of the varied, particularly fantasy, author Lord Dunsany.

In his later life, Frederick Selous chronicled many of his adventures from his home in Worplesdon. Selous was a British explorer, officer, hunter and conservationist; he was famous for his exploits in south and east of Africa. His real-life adventures inspired Sir H. Rider Haggard's Allan Quatermain character.

== Freedom of the Parish ==
The following people and military units have received the Freedom of the Parish of Worplesdon.

=== Individuals ===
- Sandra A. Morgan MBE JP: 28 November 2021.
- Mary Broughton: 29 April 2026.
