= Metropolitan Green Belt =

Statutory green belt around London, England

The Metropolitan Green Belt (outlined in red) among other green belts of England

The Metropolitan Green Belt is a statutory green belt around London, England. It comprises parts of Greater London, Berkshire, Buckinghamshire, Essex, Hertfordshire, Kent and Surrey, parts of two of the three districts of Bedfordshire and a small area in Copthorne, West Sussex. (Note: The adjoining counties fall in the South East and East of England regions which are not units of local government and have certain strategic central governmental uses.) As of 2017/18, government statistics show the planning designation covered 513,860 hectares (1,269,800 acres) of land.

== History ==
For some years after 1580 Elizabeth I of England banned new building in a three-mile wide belt around the City of London, in an attempt to stop the spread of plague. However, this was not widely enforced, relatively short-lived and it was possible to buy dispensations which reduced the effect.

The concept was also inspired by those elsewhere in Europe, one being inner buffer zones and broad boulevards to separate non-ancient parts. One re-used extensive ramparts more like protective fields to serve old city walls, the Ringstraße, in inner Vienna before 1900 in which numerous parks have been laid out.

The first major proposals for a green belt were put forward from 1890 onward, but the first to garner widespread support was put forward by the London Society (LS) in its Development Plan of Greater London 1919. The LS, alongside the Campaign to Protect Rural England (CPRE), first lobbied for a belt (initially of up to two miles wide) to prevent urban sprawl, beyond which new development could occur; this was not realised. The great interwar Britain housing boom, from 8 million homes in 1921 to 11.3 million in 1939, saw most of today's Greater London apart from its very edge developed too densely to be conferred any near-contiguous green belt status. The great increase in private motor transport continued into the 1950s. Despite new roads and the London Underground, London traffic congestion and pollution was forecast to become highly problematic unless development could be encouraged outside of a contiguous capital city. A solution emerged from study of the localised preservation of the character of the couronne périurbaine (around-town crown) surrounding Paris, and a movement to expand instead satellite towns and other towns in France. In 1947, Jean-François Gravier successfully advocated to the French government major policies to reduce "regional disparity". Labour's Attlee ministry acted similarly in Britain, first enacting the New Towns Act 1946 (9 & 10 Geo. 6. c. 68) and issuing circulars and planning policies for local government councils to implement including accelerating the designation of the Metropolitan Green Belt.

Green Belt (London and Home Counties) Act 1938
- Act of Parliament
- Parliament of the United Kingdom
- Long title: An Act to make provision for the preservation from industrial or building development of areas of land in and around the administrative county of London to confer powers for that purpose upon the London County Council and certain other authorities and persons and for other purposes.
- Citation: 1 & 2 Geo. 6. c. xciii

Dates
- Royal assent: 29 July 1938

The first policy groundwork to the Metropolitan Green Belt was in Herbert Morrison's 1934 leadership of the London County Council. It was first formally proposed by the Greater London Regional Planning Committee in 1935, "to provide a reserve supply of public open spaces and of recreational areas and to establish a green belt or girdle of open space". The Greater London Regional Planning Committee tried to convince the government to pay for the green belt. The ongoing policy decisions made were approved and entrenched in an advisory Greater London Plan prepared by Patrick Abercrombie in 1944 (which sought a belt of up to six miles, 9.7 km wide). After passage of the Green Belt (London and Home Counties) Act 1938 (1 & 2 Geo. 6. c. xciii), it took 14 years for the elected local authorities responsible for the area around London to define the area on scaled maps with some precision. Following the establishment of the belt around London, feedback being received, and statements and debates in the House of Commons, other authorities nationwide were similarly encouraged in 1955 by Minister Duncan Sandys to designate a belt of all undeveloped land. As to London it was idealised to extend to land not earmarked for building "7 to 10 miles deep all around the built-up area of Greater London".

New provisions for compensation in the Town and Country Planning Act 1947 (10 & 11 Geo. 6. c. 51) allowed local authorities to incorporate green belt proposals in their first development plans. The codification of Green Belt policy and its extension to areas other than London came with Sandys' annexed Circular 42/55 urging the Clerk of the Council of all local planning authorities (impliedly who had not done so already) to establish Green Belts "wherever it is desirable....(a) to check further growth of a large built-up area; (b) to prevent neighbouring towns from merging into one another; or (c) preserve the special character of a town." This decision was made in tandem with the New Towns Act 1946 (9 & 10 Geo. 6. c. 68), which accompanied other acts turning to commercial use or low density bomb-stricken parts of Inner London, providing new homes for residents in districts of Outer London which would accept social housing and founding the post-war new towns. Created under the New Towns Act outside of the belt were Basildon, Bracknell, Harlow, Hatfield, Hemel Hempstead, Milton Keynes and Stevenage. Much funding was outlaid in new roads, railway stations and social housing. Contrasting to these new towns such a degree of social housing was still as strongly resisted as possible in upmarket suburbs and most of the existing exurbs well-connected to London in the new Green Belt which almost unwaveringly elected majority-Conservative councils. Such private housing-dominant bastions of the Green Belt being Edgware, Amersham, Staines upon Thames, Surbiton, Sevenoaks and Epping.

In the 1938–1950s period, earmarking of the Green Belt intra-London infill areas continued to be earmarked for housing and those to "round off" the shape of London as official policy. A direct consequence was that when London was redrawn (namely from the 1889 County of London to Greater London) its area in 1965 was made five times greater. This selective and encouraged urbanisation, coupled with the New Towns, ensured authorities did not need to expect a shortage of housing and were centrally lobbied (and in some cases also locally lobbied) to designate land as Green Belt in order to offset congestion and pollution consequent upon their policies of growth.

As the outward growth of London was seen to be firmly repressed, residents owning properties further from the built-up area also campaigned for this policy of urban restraint, partly to safeguard their own investments but often invoking the paradigm English thinking running from John Ruskin to at least John Betjeman, a scenic/rustic argument which lays the blame for most social ills upon urban influences and which leads few retired people to live in London. In mid-1971, mindful of the new towns in Bedfordshire and Hertfordshire, the government decided to extend the Metropolitan Green Belt northwards to include almost all of Hertfordshire. The Metropolitan Green Belt now covers parts of 68 different districts or boroughs.

== Extension and reduction ==
London's green belt was extended after 1955, in places to a distance of 35 miles out. The belt is subject to minor annual variations, and covers an area approximately three times the size of London.

Extension has taken place to take in large parts of the Surrey Hills, Chiltern Hills and three of the areas known as various Wealds including Epping Forest, as such extension pre-dates certain largely duplicative protections which cover those areas, particularly Areas of Outstanding Natural Beauty. Redesignation includes for transport or civil engineering infrastructure, housing and non-agricultural industry, retail and non-green or blue buffer leisure. In general agriculture and open-air leisure uses, including golf courses, and fresh water reservoirs (often used for sailing), can be designated green belt land.

All Local Authorities have the option of limited green belt land release in their Local Plans, according to legally necessary "exceptional circumstances" envisioned by the 1955 Act.

Areas of Metropolitan Open Land within Greater London were given the same protection from 1976 though did not form part of the belt.

== Debate and controversy ==
The London Society heightened debate about the city's green belt, in 2014 in its report entitled "Green Sprawl". Other organisations, including the Planning Officers Society, echoed with specific calls for a UK Governmental review and proposals to balance land release for with concepts to compensate habitat loss and mitigate pollution, restitutionally (as if never converted).

The Adam Smith Institute wrote a paper under its core ethos of economic liberalism challenging the goals of nature and environmental protection groups who advocate greater urban density. The paper highlighted the Metropolitan Green Belt had land to build a million typical closer London fringe (low-to-medium) density homes within ten minutes walk (800m) of existing train stations, specifically circa 20,000 hectares (77 mi^{2}). It critiqued 10,000 hectares (39 mi^{2}) of golf course land.

The Royal Town Planning Institute commissioned the Building In The Green Belt? report to look into the commuting patterns in London's metropolitan green belt, to test the claims made in the Adam Smith report. Their study found only 7.4% of commuters, who lived near a railway station actually travelled to London by train on a regular basis with the vast majority (72%) travelling by private vehicle to jobs in their hometown and to other places not within London. Thus the proposal put forward in the Adam Smith report could result in 3.96 to 7.45 million additional car journeys per week on already congested roads around London. CPRE say it is a myth to connect green belts to rising house prices, since there is no clear difference in house prices between cities with green belts and cities without them, and both land and house prices are inflated by other factors such as investment.

A survey in 2016, by Ipsos Mori, found that many Londoners, particularly those who live in the most affected areas, think the trend towards ever taller, bolder skyscrapers has gone too far. More than 400 buildings of more than 20 floors in 2016 were tentatively proposed by developers in London. Among respondents, six out of ten backed a limit on the height of new skyscrapers, with the same proportion backing restrictions on the number of buildings with more than 50 floors.

== Designated area ==
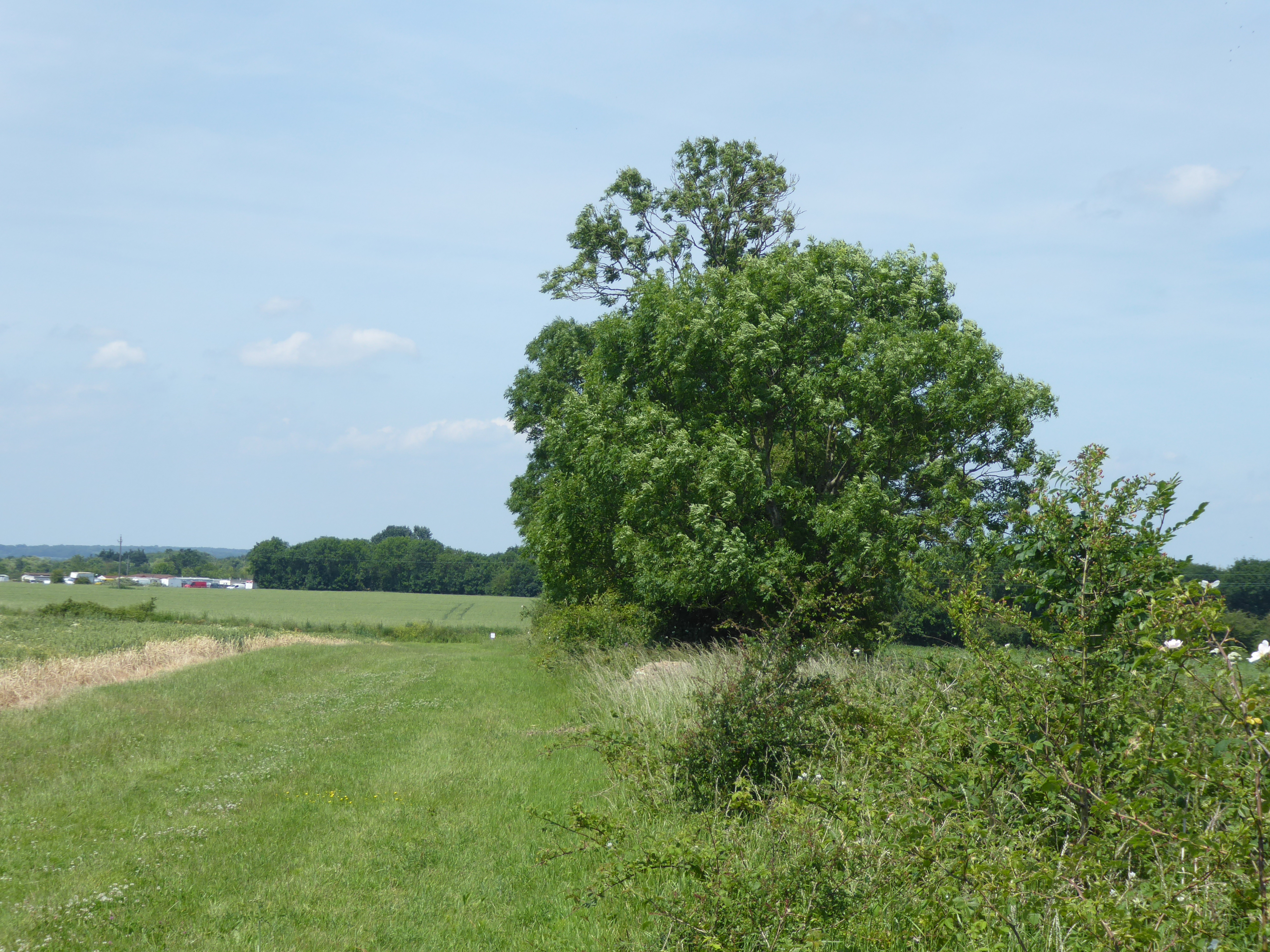
Green belt land in north Havering

The table lists the areas designated as the Metropolitan Green Belt in 2014. Between 2009 and 2014 there was a reduction of 435 hectares (1,070 acres; 1.68 sq mi). By 2014 the only Inner London Borough to have had Green Belt, Greenwich, had lost its few acres of green belt designation.

Every borough or equivalent district of the reduced counties of Surrey and Hertfordshire has Green Belt as does Bedfordshire, a county which has never contributed to present definition of London and has just 3 local government units. Four of five districts in Buckinghamshire, 4 of 6 in Berkshire, 9 of 14 in Essex, 7 of 13 in Kent, 18 of the 32 London boroughs, and 1 of the 13 Sussex districts/boroughs/unitary authorities has Green Belt.

Metropolitan Green Belt area by district, 2014
Region	Ceremonial county	District		Green Belt	
Region	Ceremonial county	Name	Area ha	Area ha	%
East	Bedfordshire	Central Bedfordshire	71,600	28,220	39
East	Bedfordshire	Luton	4,300	140	3
East	Essex	Basildon	11,002	6,950	63
East	Essex	Brentwood	15,312	13,700	90
East	Essex	Castle Point	4,508	2,750	61
East	Essex	Chelmsford	34,224	12,850	38
East	Essex	Epping Forest	33,899	31,680	93
East	Essex	Harlow	3,054	640	21
East	Essex	Rochford	16,949	12,570	74
East	Essex	Southend-on-Sea	4,176	610	15
East	Essex	Thurrock	16,338	11,920	73
East	Essex	Uttlesford	64,118	3,810	6
East	Hertfordshire	Hertsmere	10,116	8,040	80
East	Hertfordshire	Broxbourne	5,143	3,310	65
East	Hertfordshire	Dacorum	21,200	10,690	50
East	Hertfordshire	East Hertfordshire	47,569	17,530	37
East	Hertfordshire	North Hertfordshire	37,540	14,250	38
East	Hertfordshire	St Albans	16,118	13,140	82
East	Hertfordshire	Stevenage	2,596	260	10
East	Hertfordshire	Three Rivers	8,880	6,840	77
East	Hertfordshire	Watford	2,150	410	19
East	Hertfordshire	Welwyn Hatfield	12,955	10,250	79
London	Greater London	Barking and Dagenham	3,609	530	15
London	Greater London	Barnet	8,674	2,380	27
London	Greater London	Bexley	6,056	1,120	18
London	Greater London	Bromley	15,015	7,730	52
London	Greater London	Croydon	8,700	2,310	27
London	Greater London	Ealing	5,553	310	6
London	Greater London	Enfield	8,220	3,060	38
London	Greater London	Haringey	2,959	60	2
London	Greater London	Harrow	5,047	1,090	22
London	Greater London	Havering	11,227	6,010	54
London	Greater London	Hillingdon	11,570	4,970	43
London	Greater London	Hounslow	5,598	1,230	22
London	Greater London	Kingston upon Thames	3,725	640	17
London	Greater London	Newham	3,622	80	2
London	Greater London	Redbridge	5,641	2,070	37
London	Greater London	Richmond upon Thames	5,741	140	2
London	Greater London	Sutton	4,385	620	14
London	Greater London	Waltham Forest	3,882	840	22
South East	Berkshire	Bracknell Forest	10,938	3,840	35
South East	Berkshire	Slough	5,400	860	16
South East	Berkshire	Windsor and Maidenhead	19,843	16,480	83
South East	Berkshire	Wokingham	17,898	2,900	16
South East	Buckinghamshire	Aylesbury Vale	9,027	4,800	53
South East	Buckinghamshire	Chiltern	19,635	17,380	89
South East	Buckinghamshire	South Bucks	12,350	14,128	87
South East	Buckinghamshire	Wycombe	32,457	15,630	48
South East	Kent	Dartford	7,277	4,110	56
South East	Kent	Gravesham	9,902	7,670	77
South East	Kent	Maidstone	39,330	530	1
South East	Kent	Medway	19,203	1,340	7
South East	Kent	Sevenoaks	37,034	34,400	93
South East	Kent	Tonbridge and Malling	24,013	17,060	71
South East	Kent	Tunbridge Wells	33,130	7,130	22
South East	Surrey	Elmbridge	9,630	5,620	58
South East	Surrey	Epsom and Ewell	3,407	1,560	46
South East	Surrey	Guildford	27,100	24,040	89
South East	Surrey	Reigate and Banstead	12,910	8,890	69
South East	Surrey	Runnymede	7,800	6,140	79
South East	Surrey	Spelthorne	5,116	3,320	65
South East	Surrey	Surrey Heath	9,510	4,190	44
South East	Surrey	Tandridge	24,820	23,300	94
South East	Surrey	Waverley	34,520	21,080	61
South East	Surrey	Woking	6,360	4,030	63
South East	West Sussex	Mid Sussex	33,402	20	0.06
Metropolitan Green Belt total				514,060	

== Notes and references ==
=== References ===
- Outskirts, by John Grindrod
