= River Bourne, Addlestone =

River in Surrey, England

Coordinates: 51.3785°N 0.4639°W

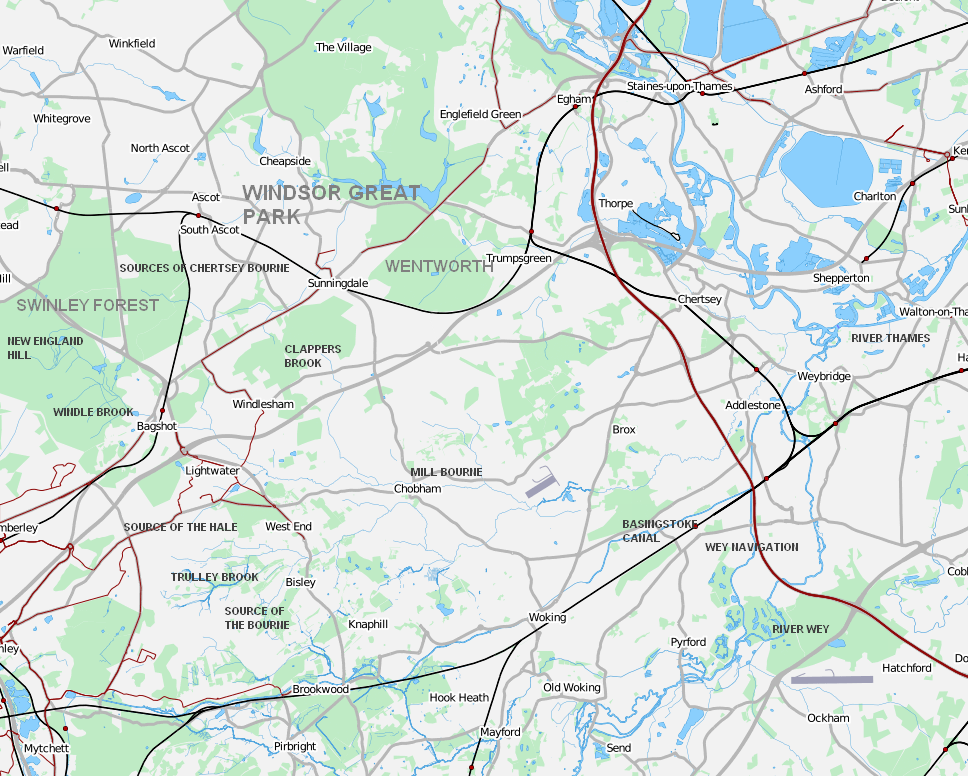
Map of the River Bourne Basin Urban areas are not shaded.

The River Bourne is the name given to a Thames tributary in northwest Surrey, England which has a longer tributary, the Windle Brook, that rises nears Bagshot Park in the south of Swinley Forest, Berkshire, merging with it while flowing through villages north of Woking; downstream the Bourne joins the Thames near Weybridge.

== Course ==
The River Bourne or The Bourne rises southwest of Bisley in Bisley Common (Note: Specifically in the western part of Bisley Common, part of the Ministry of Defence Pirbright Ranges. Bisley Common denotes two commons; the one that has these headwaters does not refer to the full public access common also known as "Reidon Hill" by Knaphill.) where it joins the longer Trulley Brook which drains Colony Bog and the middle of the Pirbright Ranges (Note: The Chobham and Pirbright Commons a Surrey Wildlife Trust area most of which is a military training area includes such areas as Strawberry Hill, Strawberry Bottom, Colony Bog, Lovelands Hill and Brock Hill), flows between West End and Bisley (Note: Bisley and West End both have the Ranges and Heath to the west), skirts the south of Chobham, makes a meander into rural north Woking and joins the much longer Mill Bourne to the east of Chobham before flowing between Woodham and Addlestone, then New Haw and Addlestone. Finally passing through some of the town, it enters St George's College, Addlestone (formerly Woburn Park) where the River Bourne joins with the River Bourne (Chertsey branch). The River Bourne then by a manmade channel turns east instead of running the final 100m into the Upper Chertsey Reach; joining the River Thames below the southern weir of Shepperton Lock and its many islands, which due to the barraging of the Thames provides (as was possible before the Thames weirs were built) a greater fall.

Along its lower course, past St George's College, Addlestone (formerly Woburn Park) the river becomes canalized and flows through 20 gardens of the Hamm Court estate, in the ecclesiastical parish of Addlestone and historically civil parish, but adjoining the Weybridge border to reach the Thames below Shepperton Lock.

=== Windle Brook ===
The Windle Brook is a small river springing at New England Hill, Swinley Forest, Berkshire a forest with some military use in the Crown Estate with further nearby sources in Bagshot, Surrey. Brooks of Windlesham merge with the Windle Brook below Windlesham Golf Club then flow through Windlesham Arboretum, a public space managed by Surrey Wildlife Trust. The brook runs north of Chobham and through Windlesham, providing the latter with its name. During this journey a few lakes are made, including Rapley Lake and just below a private lake with weir in royal Bagshot Park.

This stream goes straight eastward until before the M3 turning ESE; the Bourne becomes named the Hale Bourne when this joins from the southwest, then heads due east.

==== The Hale Bourne, Lightwater and Chobham ====
In a hilly, well-wooded strip of public heath adjoining the off-limits Pirbright Ranges Heath to the south, in Lightwater, the Hale Bourne springs which forms a small lake, Lightwater, surrounded by houses and its flow turns east when it takes on a greater amount of water from the Windle Brook below Broadway Green, Windlebrook and Rectory Farms in Lightwater; then this enlarged Hale Bourne flows into Chobham where it becomes joined by a tributary and known as the Mill Bourne.

==== The Mill Bourne, Chobham ====
As soon as joined by Clappers Brook in west Chobham the Hale becomes the Mill Bourne. It passes a recreation ground and Millbourne Bridge through the village centre picking up two main tributaries from the north (as the south is drained by The Bourne, see above), the only named one is Clappers Brook. (Note: Clappers Brook rises in Valley End, Surrey west of Staple Hill the highest point of Chobham Common) In this straight the Mill Bourne passes Town Mill, the Chobham Museum, Sow Moor and Emmett's Mill before reaching a confluence with The Bourne. This confluence is between the McLaren Technology Centre grounds and Fairoaks Airport.

=== Knaphill and Parley Brooks ===
Waterer's Park (Note: Waterer's Park is a public park) marks the start of an additional stream flowing north from Knaphill, the northern suburb of Woking forming a confluence west of Horsell Common. Just before the confluence is the confluence of the Parley Brook that stems from the Goldsworth Park recreation ground.

== Flood Risk ==
During 12–14 August 2006, much of the civil parish of Chobham suffered from severe floods due to the River Bourne and the Mill Bourne bursting their banks. The floods were caused by heavy rainfall and thunderstorms across the region that resulted in flooded homes and businesses, power cuts and road closures. This caused the rainfall to run across the land to local watercourses and low-lying areas. Two months' rainfall fell in one night and local watercourses were unable to cope with the run off so flooded adjacent land, buildings and roads.

Concerns were express by residents to the parish council that the flooding in Chobham was exacerbated on a small scale by the use of Field 0081, Pennypot Lane, Chobham as a site for travellers who have covered that area with hardcore to support their mobile homes. This area used to be a water meadow absorbing some floodwater from the River Bourne adjacent to the site. Planning permission for the site was refused as this land was seen as providing a river corridor for the River Bourne.

== Surrounding Soil, Elevations and Rainfall ==
The two main watercourses are once past Lightwater/Bisley 2.5–5 m wide flowing over land which is geologically the remains of the sandy Bagshot or Western Surrey formation, where sands and organic matter overlie clay, described as "slowly permeable loamy or peat soils" or "loamy and clayey soils with naturally high groundwater" surrounded by "free-draining naturally wet heath" on higher land, making in the uplands swathes unique, heather, gorse and coniferous habitat interspersed with bogs and brooks.

At Chobham the widest plain of surrounding land forms which is, as drained by ditches and less acidic, fertile and widely used for cultivation. Elevations range as follows:

Elevation of Bourne at centre	Settlement passed	Elevations of centre of settlement
53m ("Windle Brook")	Bagshot	55-91m
41.5m ("Windle Brook")	Windlesham Arboretum	42-46m
43.5m ("Hale Bourne")	Lightwater	45.3-60m
31—33m (River Bourne)	Bisley	36m-55m
30—32m (River Bourne)	West End	31.7-42m (mostly 33-42m)
25m (River Bourne)	Chobham (High Street south of Church)	26—27.2m
27.2m ("Mill Bourne")	Chobham (High Street and all areas off Windsor Road north of Church)	27.5-39m
15–15.5m	New Haw Golf Fun and Driving Range	15.5-16.2m
11.5–14m	Addlestone	13-21m

Local annual rainfall is about 635 mm.

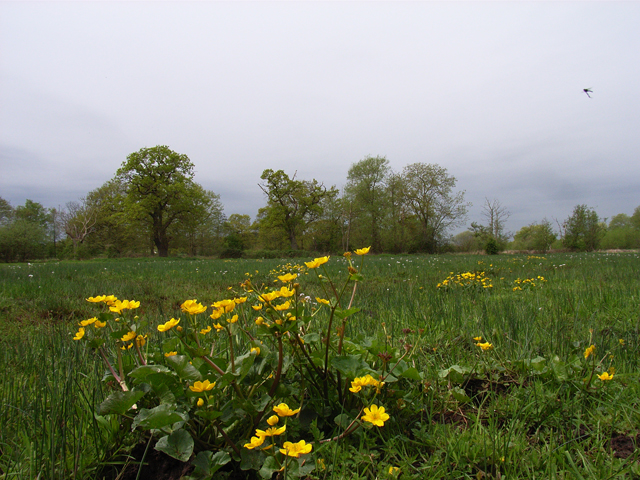
Field adjoining the Mill Bourne

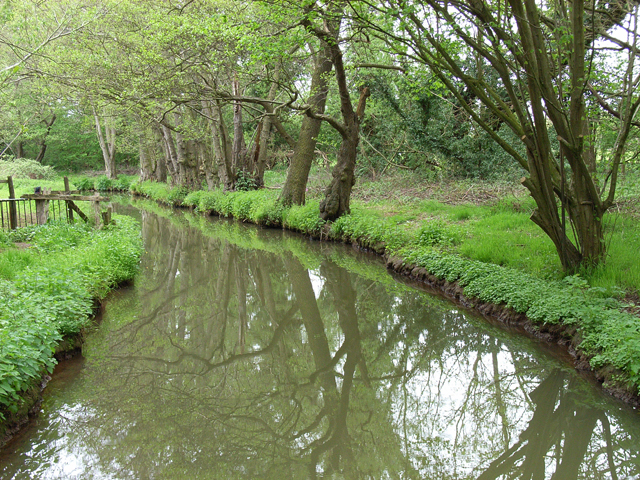
Mill Bourne
east stretch
at Emmett's Mill

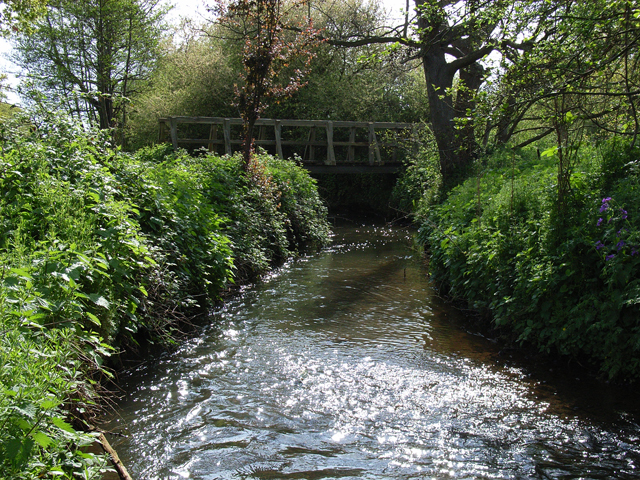
Mill Bourne
west stretch by the Village Mill

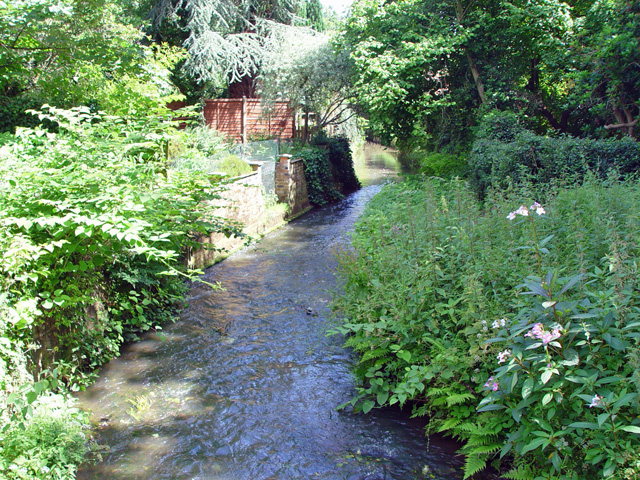
Mill Bourne
west stretch

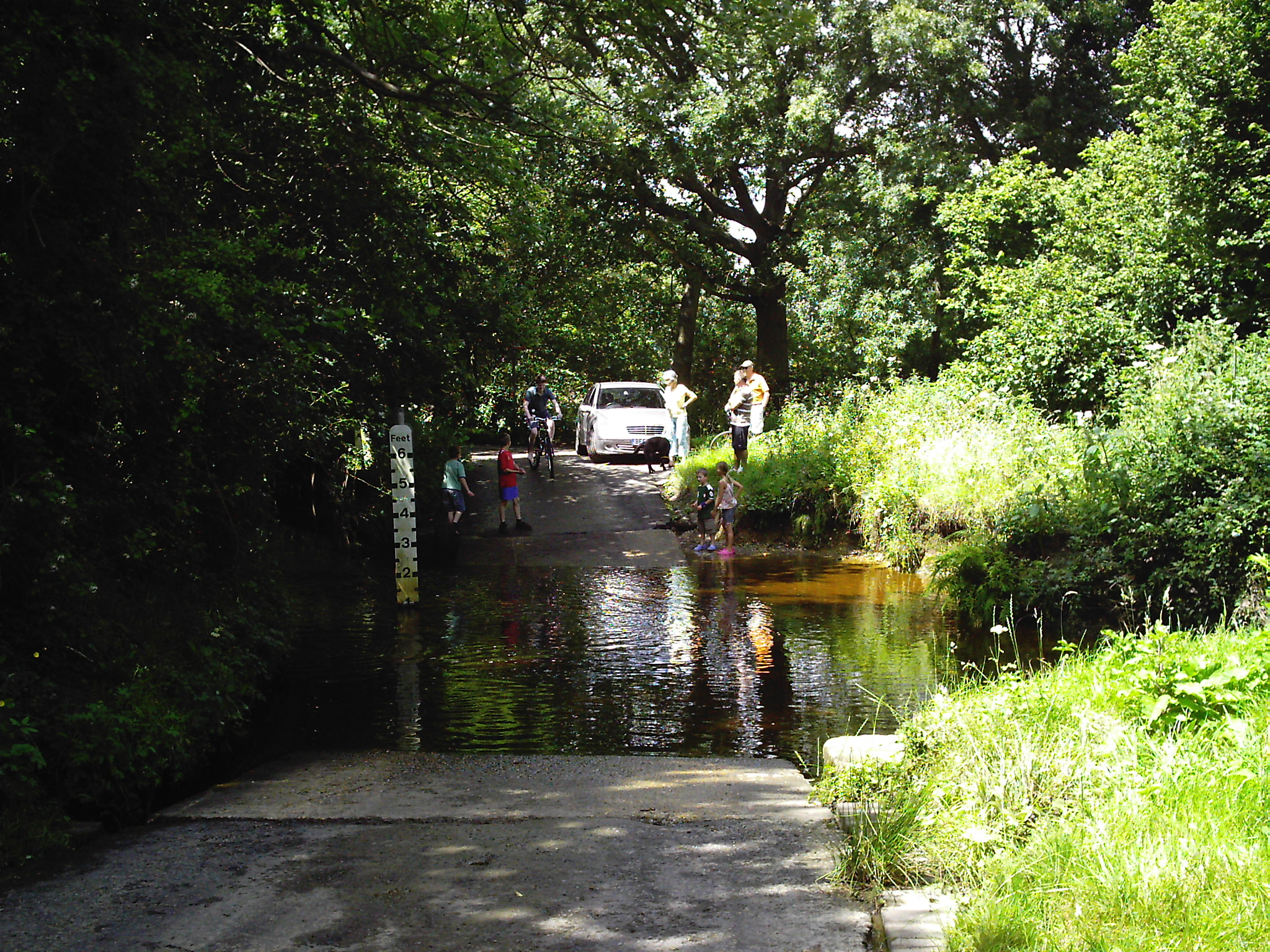
Ford at Lovelands Lane across the river Bourne, south of Penny Pot, Chobham

== Fishing ==
Being capable of the grant of private land fishing rights by all adjoining landowners, not being a navigable river, several fishing groups use the river without need for government body permits.

Bourne Anglers, for instance is a small fishing club/conservation group, started in 2013. The club has been set up to maintain the river and with kind permission of various landowners has kept stretches a free fishing river.

== See also ==
- Tributaries of the River Thames
- List of rivers of England

== Notes and references ==
Notes

Next confluence upstream	River Thames	Next confluence downstream
Abbey River (south)	River Bourne, Addlestone with River Bourne, Chertsey	Wey and Godalming Navigations (south)
