= Windlesham =

Village and parish in Surrey, England

Coordinates: 51.36°N 0.66°W

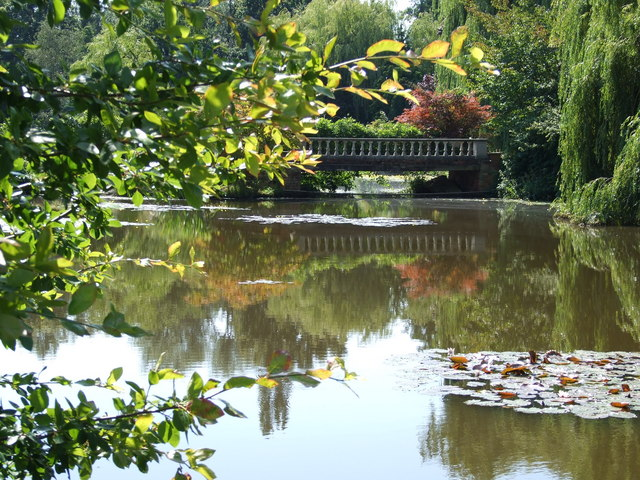
- The Arboretum

- Location within Surrey
- Area: 22.4 km^{2} (8.6 sq mi)
- Population: 4,000
  - Density: 179/km^{2} (460/sq mi)
- OS grid reference: SU930635
- Civil parish: Windlesham
- District: Surrey Heath
- Shire county: Surrey
- Region: South East
- Country: England
- Sovereign state: United Kingdom
- Post town: WINDLESHAM
- Postcode district: GU20
- Dialling code: 01276, some 01344
- Police: Surrey
- Fire: Surrey
- Ambulance: South East Coast
- UK Parliament: Surrey Heath

Windlesham is a geographically-large village in the Surrey Heath borough of Surrey, England, approximately 25 miles (40 km) south west of central London. Its name derives from the Windle Brook, which runs south of the village into Chobham, and the common suffix 'ham', the Old English word for 'homestead'. The village of Windlesham has a population of around 4,000, while the civil parish of Windlesham has a population of 17,000 and includes the much larger neighbouring villages of Bagshot and Lightwater.

Windlesham Arboretum, which covers an area of approximately 1 km^{2} (0.39 sq mi), is on the south side of the M3 motorway. Access to the motorway is via Junction 3. The nearest railway stations are Sunningdale and Bagshot, with Sunningdale offering the most frequent services for London Waterloo on the Waterloo–Reading line.

== History ==
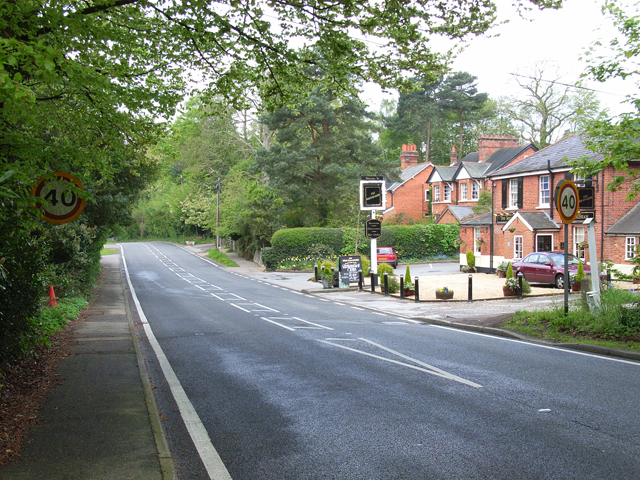
A typical long line of Victorian houses close to the village centre. The Brickmakers Arms is visible.

The neighbourhood has yielded bronze implements, now in the Archaeological Society's Museum, Guildford, and a number of Neolithic flints.

Windlesham was once a small community within Windsor Great Park, built as a remote farming settlement around undulating heath, similar to Sunninghill. At Ribs Down in the north in private Updown Court (now called Oakwood) and adjoining gardens, land reaches 99 metres above sea level with a minimum descent (notch/col) of 31 metres, ranking 35th of 36 Surrey hills listed in the national hill-climbing database and the tallest private hill in Surrey.

This corner of the county appears, from absence of notice in the Domesday Book of 1086, to have been very sparsely inhabited. Of Windlesham, Malden wrote:

Windlesham Inclosure Act 1812
- Act of Parliament
- Parliament of the United Kingdom
- Long title: An Act for inclosing Lands in the Parish of Windlesham, in the County of Surrey.
- Citation: 52 Geo. 3. c. clxvi

Dates
- Royal assent: 9 June 1812

Text of statute as originally enacted

The old road had been the source of great prosperity in Bagshot till it was superseded by the railway. Thirty coaches a day passed through, and there were many inns, since closed. The most interesting history of the place is in connexion with Windsor Forest, and its bailiwick in Surrey. The tenure of Bagshot in the Red Book of the Exchequer is per serjentiam veltrariae, i.e. providing a leash of hounds. The later history is full of the exploits of highwaymen, who found the wild country hereabouts specially favourable for their purposes. The Inclosure Act of 1812 (Note: Windlesham Inclosure Act 1812 (52 Geo. 3. c. clxvi)) inclosed much of Bagshot Heath, and also inclosed the common fields of Windlesham. Inclosure had begun before, for in 1768 the lords of the manors and the freeholders gave land inclosed from the waste for charitable purposes.

Windlesham Manor appears among the manors granted to Westminster by Edward the Confessor in his foundation charter. It was apparently transferred to the small local Broomhall Convent at an unknown date.

Newark Priory had a grant of land in Windlesham in 1256, and had the advowson (right to appoint the vicar) of the church. Joan Rawlyns, Prioress of Broomhall, made a voluntary surrender of the property of her house in 1522 before the 1538 Dissolution of the Monasteries. In the next year Windlesham was granted to St. John's College, Cambridge, who still held it in 1911

In 1911, the village was, due to Surrey Heath, described as almost entirely modern, in much the same way as Wentworth, Surrey's landscape was tamed approximately at the turn of the 20th century, being naturally heather, gorse and fern and ideal for grass and laid out evergreen trees.

Windlesham Arboretum is connected by footpath to the edge of the village centre but on the opposite side of the M3 motorway. In July 2007 in Windlesham, the most expensive house in the world, Oakwood (previously named 'Updown Court'), was valued at £75m ($138m (USD). This 103-room mansion has 58 acres (23 ha) of gardens and landscaped woodlands.

== Economy ==
The Lilly Research Centre, built in 1967, was located in the north of the village, but the site has since been acquired by UCB. The BOC Group was based in the village, but was bought by Linde plc (Linde AG of Germany) in September 2006. Linde have also since moved on, to be replaced by Gordon Murray Group.

== Local schools ==
There are two schools in Windlesham: Windlesham Village Infant School and Fernways School. Other nearby schools include Valley End C of E Infant School (Valley End, Chobham) and Hall Grove School (Bagshot).

== Recreation and social events ==
Windlesham Field of Remembrance is owned, funded and run by the village community via a board of volunteer trustees. The land was purchased from Admiral Cochrane in 1950 as a permanent memorial to the men and women of the village who lost their lives in the two World Wars, and is the site for the village's Remembrance Day ceremony. It consists of both open space and mature woodland and includes a play area. Many village events take place on the field, including the annual Village Fete. The field is also used by the village's football and cricket clubs. Other groups in the village include Windle Valley Runners and Windlesham Drama Group.

An annual Pram Race, in which teams race around the village stopping at every pub, happens every Boxing Day and raises money for local charities. Windlesham was the first village to become a hedgehog friendly village, and is reported to be one of a handful of such villages in the United Kingdom.

== Notable residents ==
- Mukhtar Ablyazov, Kazakhstani exile, government minister and bank chairman, alleged perpetrator of "one of largest frauds to appear before a court in the UK". Had UK asylum status removed and fled to France
- Edward Baigent was an early immigrant to Nelson, New Zealand and he was later elected to its Parliament.
- Lin Blakley, EastEnders star, previously lived there.
- Brian Blessed, actor, adventurer and broadcaster; current resident.
- Agatha Christie, crime writer, lived at Ribsden, but later moved to Winterbrook near Wallingford in Oxfordshire, and is buried in Cholsey churchyard.
- Elizabeth II lived in Windlesham Moor at one time shortly after her marriage before moving to Clarence House. After she became Queen she moved to Buckingham Palace.
- George Job Elvey, organist, died at The Towers.
- Sir Nick Faldo, golfer, previously lived there.
- Sean Fitzpatrick, New Zealand rugby player, was a long-term resident.
- Jessica Henwick, actress
- Glenn Hoddle, former England football manager.
- Sir Joseph Hooker F.R.S., scientist, at The Camp
- Dr Brian May, composer, guitarist and astrophysicist, member of the rock band Queen, and his wife, actress Anita Dobson.
- Leigh-Anne Pinnock, Little Mix member, and footballer Andre Gray lived in Windlesham until 2021/2.
- Sheikh Mohammed bin Rashid Al Maktoum, ruler of Dubai, has a property on Westwood Road in Windlesham.
- Andrew Ridgeley, musician of Wham!, was born in the nursing home that was along Hatton Hill, Windlesham.
- Sarah, Duchess of York Queen Elizabeth II purchased Birch Hall on Church Road in 1997 as a future home for the Duchess and her daughters following the end of her marriage, but they never took up residence.

== Localities ==
=== Valley End ===
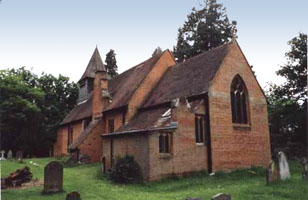
St Saviour, Valley End, Surrey

Valley End is a hamlet and chapelry in the Borough of Surrey Heath in Surrey, England, 0.5 miles (0.80 km) east of Windlesham, so similarly is about 15 minutes drive from the South West Main Line at Woking to the southeast and from Sunningdale on the Waterloo to Reading Line to the north.

Valley End has two churches, St Saviour which was built in 1867 by the English architect George Frederick Bodley and Emmanuel Baptist Church. St Saviour's is built in red and brown brick with stone dressed windows. The interior is a simple mixture of brick and stone. There is a Holy Communion service every Sunday at 9am.

Valley End School was founded in 1859 by the Hon. Julia Bathurst of Hyams Hall, Windlesham.

The Valley End Cricket Club was founded in 1895.

=== Bagshot ===
See Bagshot for this developed part of the civil parish, which has the greatest concentration of homes, shops and businesses compared to Windlesham and Lightwater.

=== Lightwater ===
See Lightwater for this developed part of the civil parish
