= Windlesham Arboretum =

Arboretum in Surrey, England

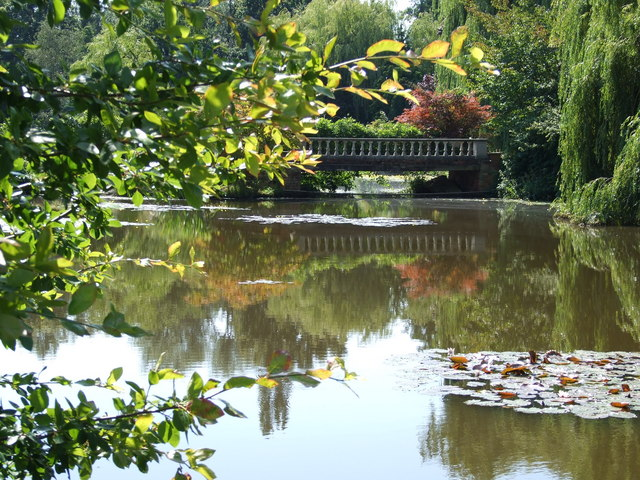

- Location within Surrey
- Type: Arboretum
- Location: Windlesham, Surrey
- Coordinates: 51°21′18″N 0°40′21″W
- Area: 1 km^{2} (0.39 sq mi)
- Operator: The Spowers Charitable Trust

Windlesham Arboretum is between the villages of Windlesham and Lightwater in Surrey, United Kingdom, just south of Junction 3 on the M3. Founded in 1957 by Major William Spowers following the purchase of 17 acres of Windlesham marsh land.

The arboretum features lakes, monuments, follies, a small chapel and approximately 22,000 mature and rare trees. The Windle Brook runs through the arboretum and has seven main footbridges and approximately ten ponds on each side, some of which are more properly identifiable as lakes based on size. The land and lakes, including a scattered number of buildings altogether consist of just over 1 square kilometre (0.39 sq mi).

== History ==
Major William Spowers purchased Old House Farm a then derelict 15th cottage set in 17 acres of marsh land, Windlesham in 1957. Spowers was well known for generously entertaining, notable guests included Princess Margaret, Bing Crosby and Kabaka of Buganda. The first of the lakes was created using army tanks with bulldozer blades fitted to the front. Over the years further properties were acquired bringing the site to some 160 acres, allowing for the planting of some 4,500 trees and boasting a collection of over 3,600 specimens by his death in 2009. In 1982 the Spowers Charitable Trust which manages the arboretum was founded.

Following his death ownership of the land passed to Adam Spowers of New South Wales, Leslie Scott of nearby Bagshot and Hugo Spowers of Leominster.

== Features ==
The arboretum, which is also a fresh water park, is located in the south of the civil parish of Windlesham, where alluvial soils juxtapose, furthest from the brook, with acidic, naturally wet, heath.

By the end of the first decade of the 21st century, the arboretum contained in excess of 3,500 species of tree, including an extensive collection of Eucalyptus plants.

== Ownership and rules ==
The arboretum is owned by a charitable trust. The objects of the charitable trust are to advance education in the study of trees and birds and access to the arboretum is restricted to educational activities. The public is permitted limited access from four main entry points, spread around the compass, during daylight hours. Picnics, barbecues, cycling and leisure activities other than walking, study and reflection are prohibited. It is patrolled most days, and maintained to ensure its use remains in accordance with the trust's objectives.

== Archaeology ==
An archeological survey of the Arboretum was carried out by the Surrey Heath Archaeological & Heritage Trust. in the 1980s. Evidence of Iron Age enclosure ditches and Romano-British agricultural buildings was discovered.
