= Windlesham Moor =

Coordinates: 51.380°N 0.676°W

General information
- Type: Country house
- Location: Windlesham, Surrey, England

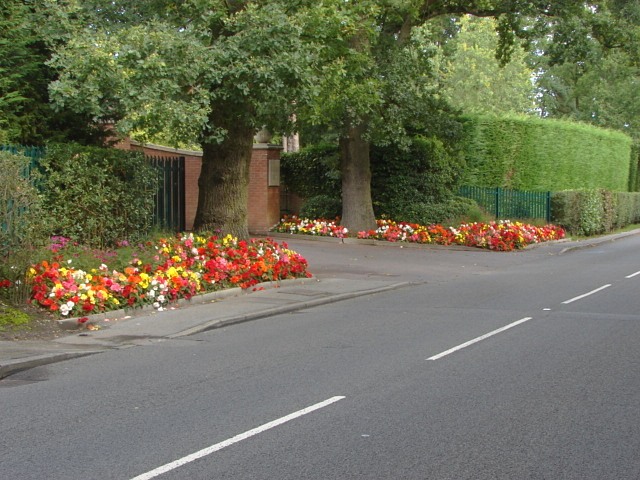
Windlesham Moor main entrance

Position in Surrey

Windlesham Moor is an English country house and former royal residence at Windlesham in the county of Surrey. In its capacity as a royal residence, it was the home of Princess Elizabeth (later Queen Elizabeth II) and her husband Philip, Duke of Edinburgh from their wedding in November 1947 until July 1949, when they moved to Clarence House in London.

== History ==
Philip Hill bought the Victorian home and grounds in a state of disrepair in 1942 for £40,000 (equivalent to £1,630,000 in 2025). Later, the Royal Family bought the renovated Sunninghill Park house and park from Hill. He renovated the house in 1944. It was rented furnished from his widow, Mrs. Warwick Bryant, for Princess Elizabeth and Philip, Duke of Edinburgh, between 1947 and 4 July 1949.

The design of the house had four reception rooms including a reception hall, a dining room, a 50-foot (15 m) drawing room, and a Chinese room. Other rooms during the royal tenure included a study, a games room, loggia and five main bedrooms. The nursery comprised two guest rooms joined together.

The estate included 58 acres (0.23 km^{2}) of land, largely light woodland in the acidic heath of Surrey Heath on the elevated Bagshot Formation (Bagshot sands).

A painting of the house and gardens circa 1934, attributed to Winston Churchill, was discovered and sold at auction in September 2008.

=== Neighbours ===
Across the nearby border with Berkshire to the north and west is part of Swinley Forest lying in the Crown Estate. The larger part of the forest is further west, on the other side of the Ascot to Ash Vale railway line, and features two golf courses. To the south is Erl Wood Manor European research laboratory, established in 1967 for American pharmaceutical conglomerate Eli Lilly and Company. To the southwest beyond the train line is a private racecourse and then Bagshot Park. To the east are smallholdings and gardens of detached homes including Windlesham Hill Farm, which is divided into three properties. A 21st-century care home has been established on part of the former farm.

== Present ==
The house was acquired by Sheikh Hamdan bin Rashid Al Maktoum, a senior member of the royal family of Dubai, who carried out significant renovation and extensions, added a security gatehouse in 2002, and added the properties of Winklands and Rose Cottage to the estate. From July to September, Al Maktoum, his family, and other Arab dignitaries live in the house. Occasionally the Sheikh's guests live there at other times. The property is maintained by property managers, gardeners and security personnel.
