= Updown Court =

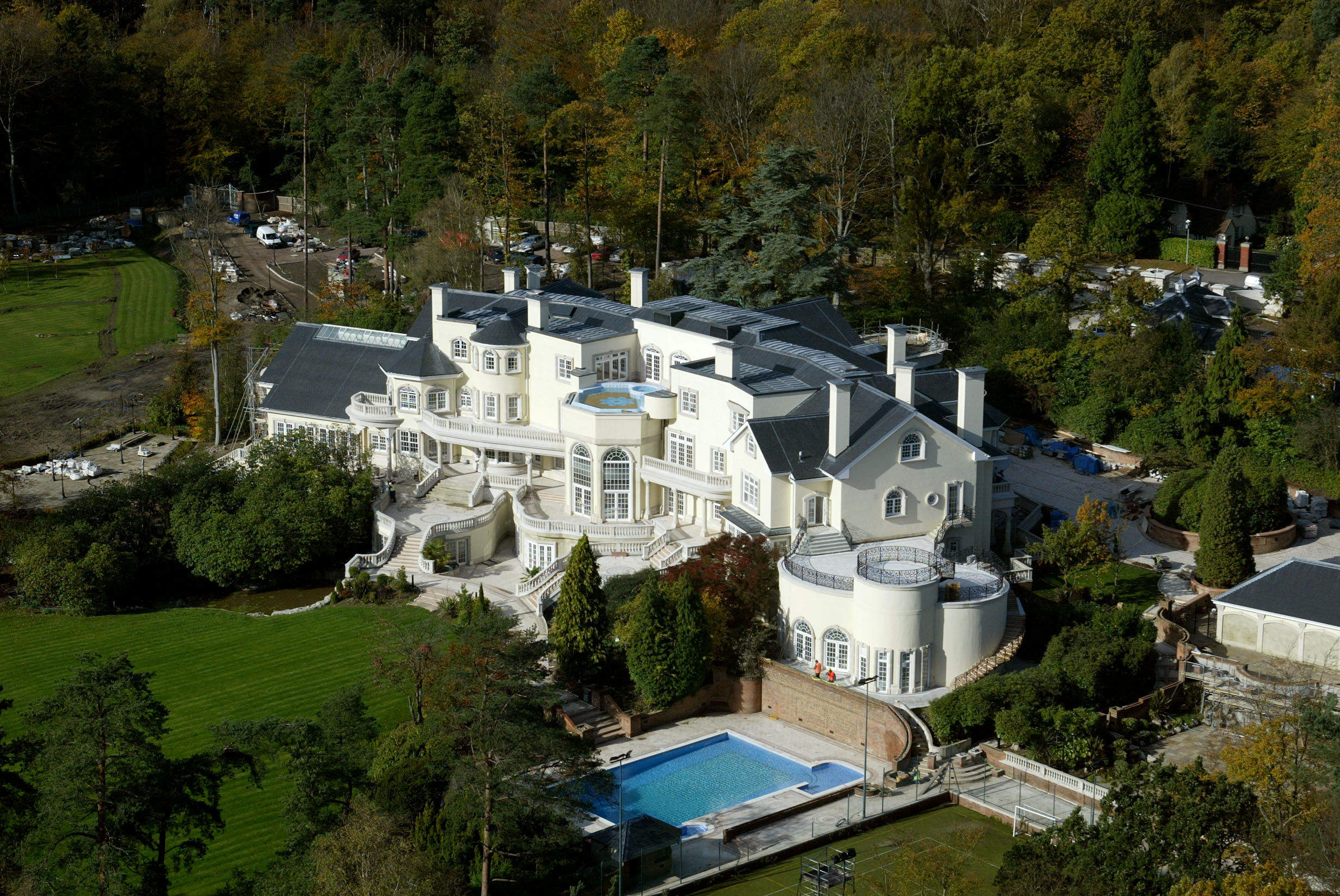
- Updown Court

- Location within Surrey

General information
- Architectural style: neo-classic Californian
- Location: Windlesham, Surrey, England
- Coordinates: 51°22′07″N 0°38′41″W
- Construction started: 1998
- Completed: 2006

Technical details
- Size: 58 acres (230,000 m^{2})

Design and construction
- Architect: John B. Scholz

Other information
- Number of rooms: 103 rooms

Updown Court is a Californian style residence situated in the village of Windlesham in Surrey, England. The 103-room mansion has 58 acres (23 ha) of landscaped gardens and private woodland. It was, in 2005, the most expensive private home on the market anywhere in the world, having been listed for sale with estate agencies Savills and Hamptons International for in excess of £70 million (US$138 million).

== First house ==
The original Updown Court was built in 1924 in the Queen Anne style. It featured eight bedrooms, four sitting rooms, four bathrooms, a single swimming pool, and sat in 12 acres (4.9 ha) of grounds. Between 1962 and 1976 the property was home to Major General Sir Philip Ward, his wife Pamela and their four children, and during their ownership the gardens were open to the public to enjoy the spectacular woodland and roses. In 1977 Updown Court was acquired from the Wards by His Highness Prince Sami Gayed of Egypt.

=== Fire ===
In October 1987, the estate agency Knight Frank and Rutley were instructed to market the property for sale. On the morning after The Great Storm of 1987 (16 October), Antony Wardell, the agent, drove to the property to measure it up. Upon arriving, he discovered that during the storm the property had been destroyed by fire. Trees felled by the storm had brought down power lines, causing an explosion in the house and starting a fire. When Surrey Fire and Rescue Service had tried to reach Updown Court, they found their way blocked by more fallen trees and were unable to reach the house, which as a result was totally destroyed.

== Second house ==
In the 1990s the ruined property was sold to Heatherside Property Holdings Limited, a consortium registered in the British Virgin Islands by Martin Burrow of Hamptons International. A redevelopment of the site was masterminded by consultant engineer Anthony Pearce and designed by John B. Scholz, an Arizona-based architect.

Construction started in 1998 and in August 1999, rumours surfaced that the property (still under construction), was to be bought by Hollywood actor Bruce Willis. Other potential buyers who were rumoured to be connected with the property included Sheikh Mohammed al Maktoum, then Crown Prince of Dubai, and the Tengku Mahkota of Pahang; Tengku Abdullah.

=== 2001 customs raid ===
On 19 July 2001, HM Customs and Excise launched a raid on the property in connection with money laundering. Customs officers were joined by Surrey Police and members of the National Crime Squad for the dawn raid. The raid came a day after HMCE had launched a High Court action and obtained an order allowing them to appoint a risk consultancy company to take over the running of the project as joint receivers and managers. Anthony Pearce was charged with using the proceeds of crime to buy and develop the property. He was also charged with a second offence relating to the purchase of a yacht and was remanded on conditional bail until 2 August 2001. Another man was released on bail and two others were freed without charge.

=== First receivership, purchase by Leslie Allen-Vercoe and further redevelopment ===
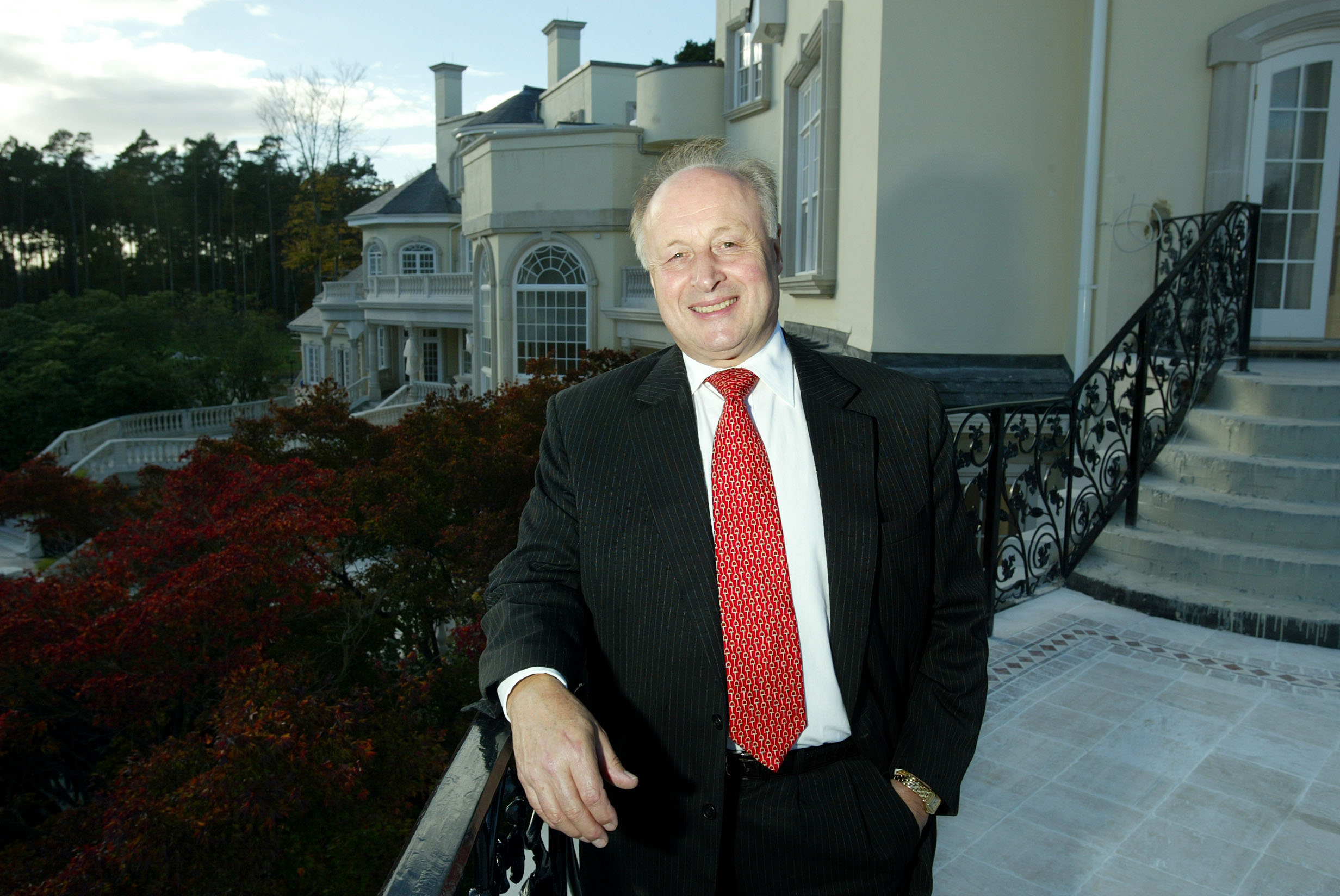
Allen-Vercoe at Updown Court

Heatherside was put into the hands of an administrative receiver, Vivian Bairstow of Begbies Traynor. In 2002 Bairstow instructed FPDSavills and Knight Frank, to sell Updown Court to recover the company's assets and pay back creditors, who included an overseas lender. The guide price for the sale was £15 million and bids closed on 10 July 2002. A developer, Leslie Allen-Vercoe completed the purchase of the unfinished shell for £13 million (the approximate 2009 equivalent of £20 million) in January 2003. A planned further £30 million was to be spent finishing and redeveloping the property and the project was mainly funded by loans from the Irish Nationwide Building Society.

The structure of the deal Allen-Vercoe struck with INBS was structured in a way which only came to light when the property was placed in receivership a few years later. The bank provided the money required for the project c.£50 million, and it was agreed with INBS that if the completed project was sold for a profit, this would be split with 33.3% going to INBS and the remaining two-thirds going to Allen-Vercoe himself. If the property was sold at a loss, Allen-Vercoe would not be personally liable for any part of that loss.

In 2005, the property was completed and placed on the market for sale with Savills and Hamptons International. A leather-bound brochure, which in an effort to discourage timewasters, cost interested parties £500 to purchase, was produced and it is said that Savills were happy to arrange for prospective buyers to be driven to Updown Court in a Rolls-Royce or flown in by helicopter for a viewing. Viewings, due to the size of the property, are said to have taken in excess of two and a half hours. In light of the buoyant property market at the time and a considerable amount of press coverage, Allen-Veroe said in a 2005 interview that "It will be gone in six months. We've already had interest from buyers from Russia and the Middle East. And three Chinese called to inquire just this morning".

By the end of 2009, as a result of further loans and accrued interest INBS was owed around £61 million and when, the following year, INBS was effectively nationalised, its share of the property came to be owned by the National Asset Management Agency,

With running costs when fully staffed of around £1million a year and even reduced costs imposed by NAMA running to £60,000 per month, the property needed to start to bring in some sort of income. The property began to be rented out as a filming location and starred as a Russian Embassy in Series 8, Episode 3 of the BBC series Spooks, doubled as a war-torn Baghdad palace in the film Green Zone, and was the home of Sean and Beverly Lincoln in the Showtime/BBC series Episodes.

=== Second receivership and eventual sale ===
By May 2011, the estate was still on the market at the original price of £70 million. In a bizarre move by the owner and agents the price was increased to £75 million in June 2011, before being cut by 30% to £50 million the next month. In August 2011, the property was placed into receivership by NAMA, with CB Richard Ellis acting as receivers. and the following month it was announced that the asking price had been slashed, with the property being priced "in excess of £30m".

Finally, after over six years on the market, in October 2011, it was announced that the property had been sold for £35m by joint agents Knight Frank and Hamptons International to a purchaser, believed to be Dubai based education entrepreneur Sunny Varkey.

== The estate ==
Set in the centre of 58 acres (23 ha) of gardens and mature woodland, Updown Court is entered by a £2 million (US$3 million) heated marble driveway. It has 103 rooms, 24 of which are bedrooms, each with its own marble en-suite bathroom. Among other features, it has a fully automated two-lane bowling alley, five swimming pools including an Infinity pool, a squash court, a floodlit tennis court, a wine cellar with a capacity for 3,000 bottles and a panic room. There are 5 acres (2.0 ha) of more than 30 different types of imported Italian marble, expansive terraces, and a customizable cinema with a 50-seat capacity. It also features an underground garage, with granite flooring, that has enough room for eight cars or limousines.

The first floor is the main residential area, featuring eight generous bedroom suites, all en-suite. The penthouse floor contains two separate penthouse apartments, each with two bedrooms, reception area, bathroom, kitchen and occupies an entire wing of the property. There is a gymnasium, an indoor football pitch, and an outdoor equestrian yard with stables. There is also a sauna, and a "secret" passageway outside the mansion. There are also two "plant rooms" (conservatories), a gallery, study, and library.

Neighbours include Elton John, Sarah Ferguson, and Queen guitarist Brian May.
