= West End, Surrey =

Village and parish in Surrey, England

Coordinates: 51.338°N 0.643°W

West End
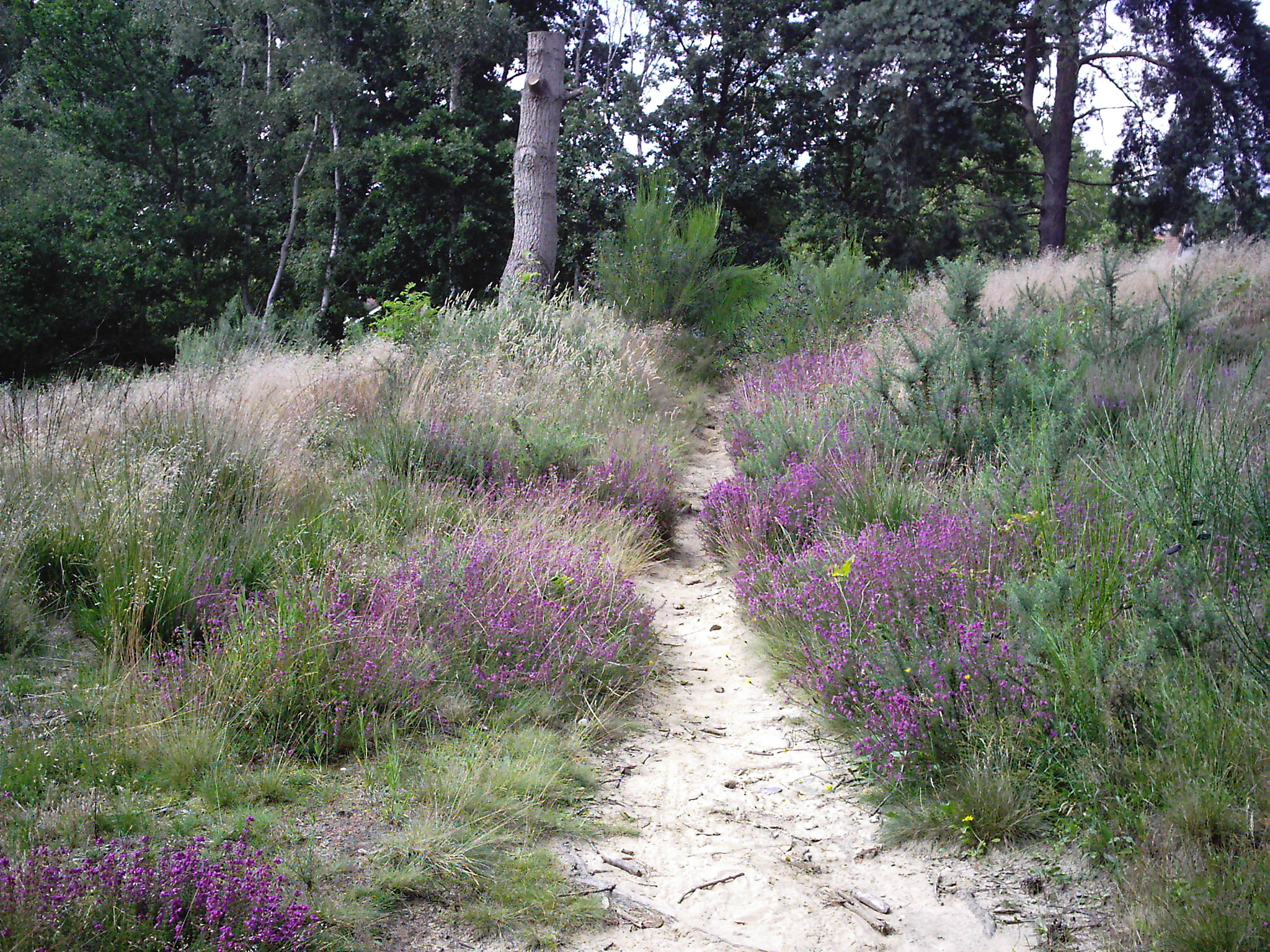
- A sandy part of West End Common notable for endemic heather (Ericaceae)

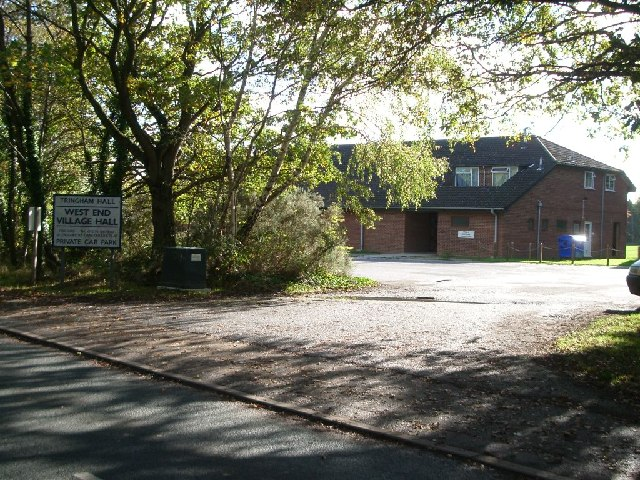
- Village hall

- Location within Surrey
- Area: 14.52 km^{2} (5.61 sq mi)
- Population: 4,693 (2011 Census)
  - Density: 323/km^{2} (840/sq mi)
- OS grid reference: SU9361
- Civil parish: West End
- Shire county: Surrey
- Region: South East
- Country: England
- Sovereign state: United Kingdom
- Post town: WOKING
- Postcode district: GU24
- Dialling code: 01483 or 01276
- Police: Surrey
- Fire: Surrey
- Ambulance: South East Coast
- UK Parliament: Surrey Heath

West End is a village and civil parish in Surrey Heath, Surrey, England, approximately 25 miles (40 km) southwest of central London. It is midway between the towns of Camberley and Woking, 4 mi (6.4 km) to the west and east respectively. The River Bourne rises from its sources to the immediate west to run through the village. Until the mid 20th century, the West End consisted of a collection of smallholdings surrounded by a substantial area of common land

West End Common is comparable in size to Chobham Common to the north and includes training ranges of the British Army. Brentmoor Heath is to the north west of the village.

West End is equidistant between Bagshot and Brookwood railway stations, both 3 miles (4.8 km) away. The village is close to junction 3 of the M3 motorway.

== History ==
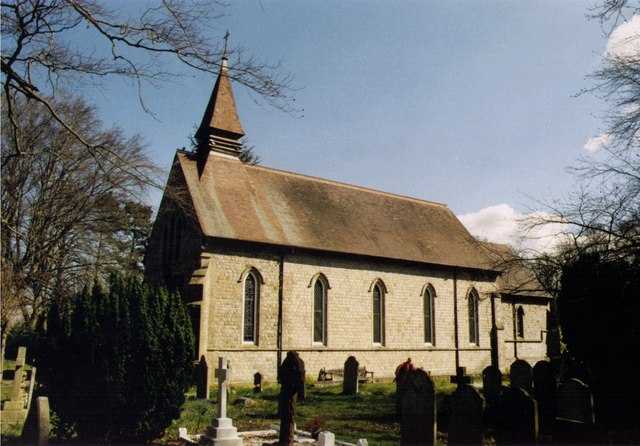
Holy Trinity Church, consecrated 1842

Nearby lands were settled in prehistoric times, evidenced within this civil parish, with a megalithic barrow on Westend Common.

West End may have obtained its name because it was the west of Chobham, 2 miles (3.2 km) ENE. The 1845 map reproduced by EJ Willson provides boundaries at that date. Its direct predecessor named Westend was in 1870–72 described by John Marius Wilson as "a tything in Worplesdon parish, Surrey; 3¼ miles NW of Guildford. Pop., 341." A dependency on Worplesdon church, as its tything, is attested in the medieval period until the late 19th century, after which the area formed part of the parish of Chobham.

The parish church, the church of the Holy Trinity, serves a similar area ecclesiastical parish and is a small building consisting of a chancel consecrated in 1890, nave consecrated in 1842, and a vestry built in 1906. The material is stone and the style is 13th century. Over the west end is a small bell-turret with a square spire above the entrance. Recognising rising population and housebuilding, the village gained its parish in 1895.

In the 20th century many houses were added to the village, and it became a significant centre of nursery gardening. The civil parish was created in 1968.

== Facilities ==
=== Amenities ===
The village provides some small shops and a BP garage. Some works operate, particularly in warehousing and distribution however most employment of an industrial, commercial, or retail kind is in neighbouring areas.

=== Education ===
The village has two schools: the Holy Trinity Church of England Primary school and Gordon's School which was built in commemoration of Gordon of Khartoum.

=== Events ===
Every year the village recreation ground holds a Summer Fete, with The Horticultural and Agricultural Show in the autumn.

=== Sports ===
The two grounds in the village host a seniors football team and cricket team, competing within the county.

=== Transport ===
The bus route 34, operated by Stagecoach South, stops outside The Inn at West End in both directions, at least hourly.

== Localities ==
=== Donkey Town ===
The western neighbourhood of the village has this locality name. However it has never formed a historically recorded hamlet under the vestry-administered system. The area is not mentioned in county records under the name of a manor.

=== West End Common ===
The West End Heath is an uninhabited restricted-access area and serves as a habitat for various rare heathland plants. It has been officially designated as such a Site of Special Scientific Interest (SSSI) by English Nature. It is also a Thames Basin Heaths Special Protection Area within the remit of Surrey Heath.

=== Lucas Green ===
A linear settlement on a cul-de-sac road, Lucas Green Road, leading to the periphery of West End Common, Lucas Green has a close cluster of four buildings, surrounding Lucas Green Manor, which are listed. One, Lucas Green Manor house, at Grade II dates to the 16th century, and Lucas Green further extends down Lucas Green Road leading on to a small hamlet on the left consisting of eleven more properties, some of which date back to the 17th Century.

== Geography ==
=== Soil and Elevation ===
Soil

Heath which is naturally wet, very acid sandy and loamy soil dominates except in patches of highest land where the Bagshot Formation of sand and sandstone contributes a greater proportion than organic matter. This heath soil is just 1.9% of English soil and 0.2% of Welsh soil, which gives rise to pines and coniferous landscapes, as well as more commonly gorse, ericaceae (all types of heather) and patches of bog.

Elevation

All the highest areas are on the western border. White Hill here provides the highest point and is publicly accessible, immediately north of Red Road which leads to Camberley 120m Above Ordnance Datum (the UK conventional measure of mean sea level). This is towards the north of a long, wide north–south ridge, known as it descends rapidly east through into the rolling restricted common as Chobham Ridges. The ridge is topped by a road, The Maultway, bounding an estate of Camberley, known as Heatherside.

=== Drainage and watercourses ===
The River Bourne (Addlestone branch) runs through the village from its sources directly to the rapidly rising landscape to the rest, largely in the civil parish.

== Demography and housing ==
The population rose between the 2001 and 2011 censuses from 4,272 to 4,693 (on an increase of 48 households).

2011 Census Homes
Output area	Detached	Semi-detached	Terraced	Flats and apartments	Caravans/temporary/mobile homes	shared between households
(Civil Parish)	1,049	387	171	76	5	0

The average level of accommodation in the region composed of detached houses was 28%, the average that was apartments was 22.6%.

2011 Census Key Statistics
Output area	Population	Households	% Owned outright	% Owned with a loan	hectares
(Civil Parish)	4,693	1,688	39.4%	47.2%	1,452

The proportion of households in the civil parish who owned their home outright compares to the regional average of 35.1%. The proportion who owned their home with a loan compares to the regional average of 32.5%. The remaining % is made up of rented dwellings (plus a negligible % of households living rent-free).

=== Residents ===
Brian May, lead guitarist of Queen is a local resident.
