= Ann Nelson (coach operator) =

British coach proprietor and publican (c. 1772–1852)

- Born: Ann Abbat c. 1772; London
- Died: 11 October 1852; London
- Occupations: innkeeper and coach operator
- Spouse: Edward Nelson
- Children: four

Ann Nelson or Ann Abbat (c. 1772 – 11 October 1852) was a British coach proprietor and publican. She started the "Exeter Telegraph" which was an express coach from London to the county town of Devon.

== Life ==
Nelson was born and probably baptised in Whitechapel in 1772. She married in 1790 to Edward Nelson in Shoreditch. He became a member of the Innkeepers company as an Innkeeper in Whitechapel.

When her husband died in 1800, she inherited the business which was based at The Bull inn in Aldgate. They had four children. She was to join the small number of women who operated coach companies. The only more successful woman in Britain was said to be Sarah Ann Mountain. Nelson's son George was occasionally a coach driver whereas his brothers John and George both joined the Innkeepers company in 1820 and 1825 respectively. They became wealthy men.

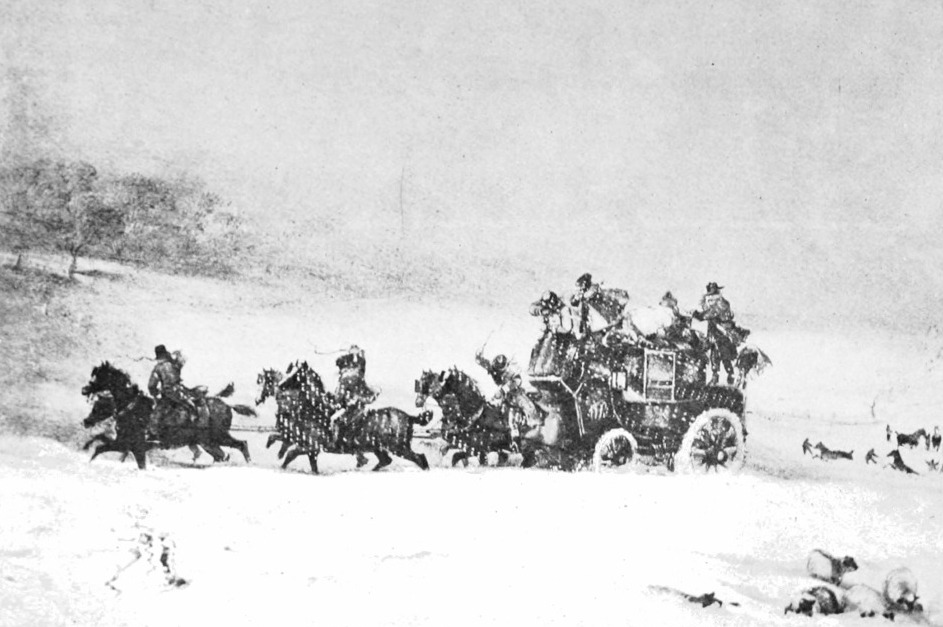
The "Exeter Telegraph" in 1836 getting through snow with post horses

Nelson ran coaches from her inn and the most known was the "Exeter Telegraph" that could convey passengers to Devon down the A303 road. She started it in 1826 and it required the organisation of horses to be exchanged over twenty times. The coach set off at 5:30 in the morning and stopped only for 20 minutes at Bagshot and a half-hour dinner at the Deptford Inn on Salisbury Plain. At first it took 17 hours and arrived at 10:30 p.m. but as the roads improved the time fell to fourteen hours. Her Exeter Telegraph was considered faster than the "Quicksilver" which took 21 hours to get to Devenport.

As her children grew she left the coaching business to her son John and in the first real census of 1841 she gave her occupation as innkeeper. Many coaches travelled from her inn everyday and she would rise early and make sure her own coach drivers' and guards' needs were well seen to. In addition her inn gave board to a hundred people each night.

Nelson "Widow of the Bull Inn" died in London in 1852.
