= Chobham =

Village and parish in Surrey, England

Coordinates: 51.348°N 0.604°W

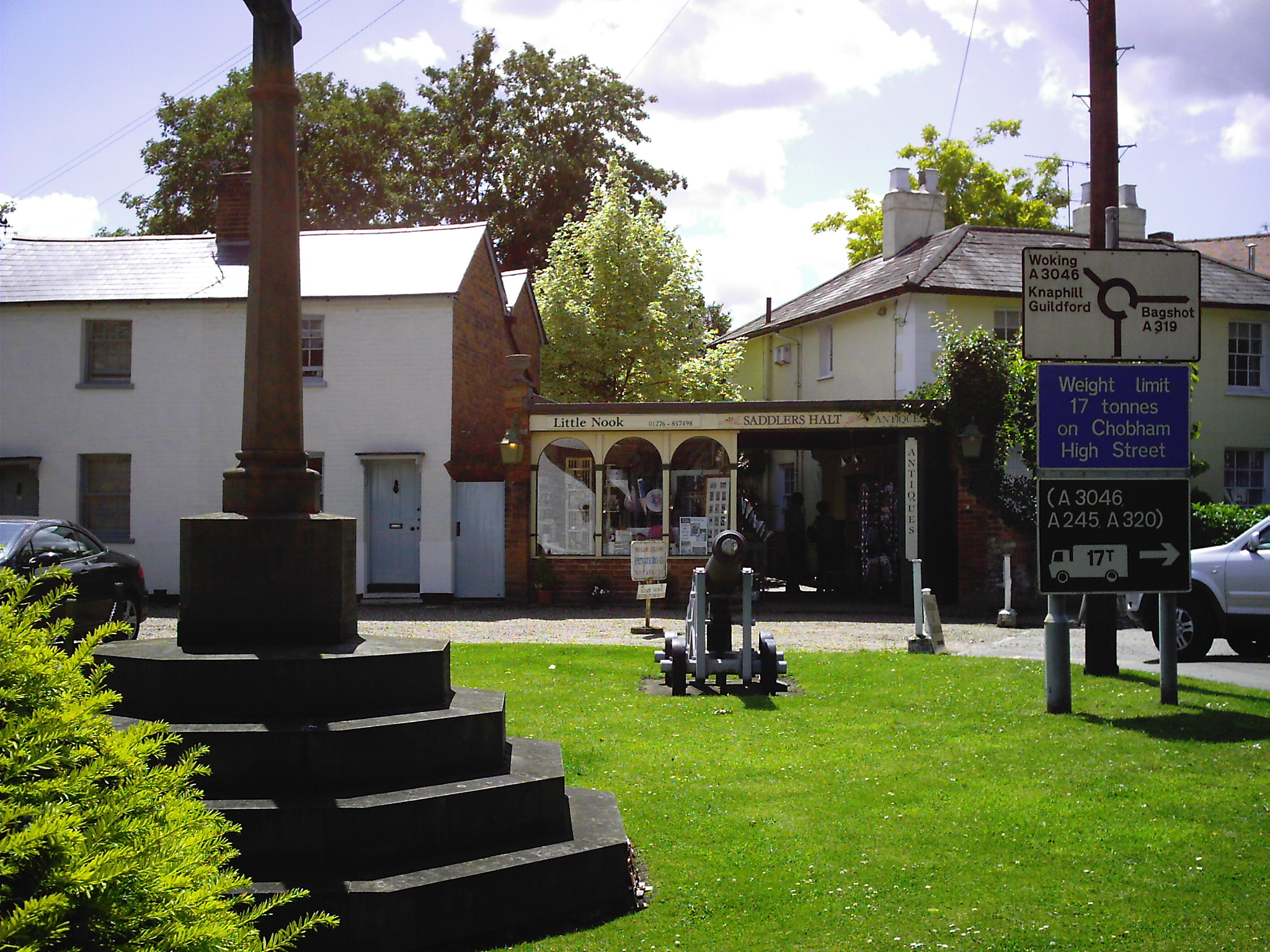
- Chobham war memorial and cannon

- Location within Surrey
- Area: 23.13 km^{2} (8.93 sq mi)
- Population: 3,799 (2011 Census)
  - Density: 164/km^{2} (420/sq mi)
- OS grid reference: SU9761
- Civil parish: Chobham
- District: Surrey Heath
- Shire county: Surrey
- Region: South East
- Country: England
- Sovereign state: United Kingdom
- Post town: Woking
- Postcode district: GU24
- Dialling code: 01276
- Police: Surrey
- Fire: Surrey
- Ambulance: South East Coast
- UK Parliament: Surrey Heath

Chobham is a village and civil parish in the Borough of Surrey Heath in Surrey, England.

The village has a small high street area, specialising in traditional trades and motor trades. The River Bourne and its northern tributary, the Hale, Mill Bourne or Windle Brook run through the village.

Chobham lost a large minority of its land to West End, in 1968, which has a larger population and was long associated with another parish. Chobham has a wide range of outlying businesses, particularly plant growing and selling businesses, science/technology and restaurants.

Chobham has no railway line; it is approximately midway between London-terminating services at Woking and Sunningdale, just under 5 miles (8.0 km) away. The village sits to the south of Chobham Common, a Site of Special Scientific Interest.

== History ==
Neolithic flints have been found and there are several round barrows on the heaths. Albury Bottom, also known as "The Bee Garden" a scheduled monument with evidence of "a roughly trapezoidal bank and ditched enclosure measuring approximately 100 x 100m, with a surviving second outer bank in some places" and the "Herestraet or Via Militaris" (an old Roman road extant in the post-Roman kingdom) of the Chertsey Abbey charters ran through Chobham parish. In 1772 Roman silver coins of Gratian and of the time of a Valentinian, and copper coins of a Theodosius, Honorius, and another Valentinian, a spear-head and a gold ring, were found near Chobham Park in the parish.

The village lay within the Godley hundred, a Saxon administrative area.

Chobham appears in the Domesday Book of 1086 as Cebeham held by Chertsey Abbey, as it was at the time of the conquest, with interests also acquired by the time of its survey, 1086, by two minor Norman figures, possibly bishops, Corbelin and Odin. Its Domesday assets were: 10 hides; 1 church, 1 chapel, 16 ploughs, 10 acres (4 ha) of meadow, woodland worth 130 hogs. It rendered £15 10s 0d per year. Chabbeham is the version written in Chertsey Charter, and Chabham was the version recorded in the 13th century Patent Rolls.

St Lawrence Church is on the High Street. Its earliest parts date from about 1080 although there may have been an earlier church on the site. It is dedicated to St Lawrence, who was martyred in Rome in 258.

Until the 19th century almost entirely surrounded by Chobham Common, which was heathland of little agricultural value compared to its central fertile belt, the village was isolated. During mediaeval times, Chobham remained part of the Chertsey Abbey estates. As across the whole hundred which he dominated, the power of the Abbot of Chertsey was considerable.

When the railways were built in the 19th century, lines running east–west went north and south of the village, passing through the neighbouring and at the time smaller villages of Sunningdale and Woking. Thus Chobham remained largely undeveloped during the Industrial Revolution and 20th century, while Woking has grown into a large town on the South West Main Line. In the 19th century peat was cut from the soil all around the village, which provided a cheap and reliable fuel source for heat, smelting and cooking.

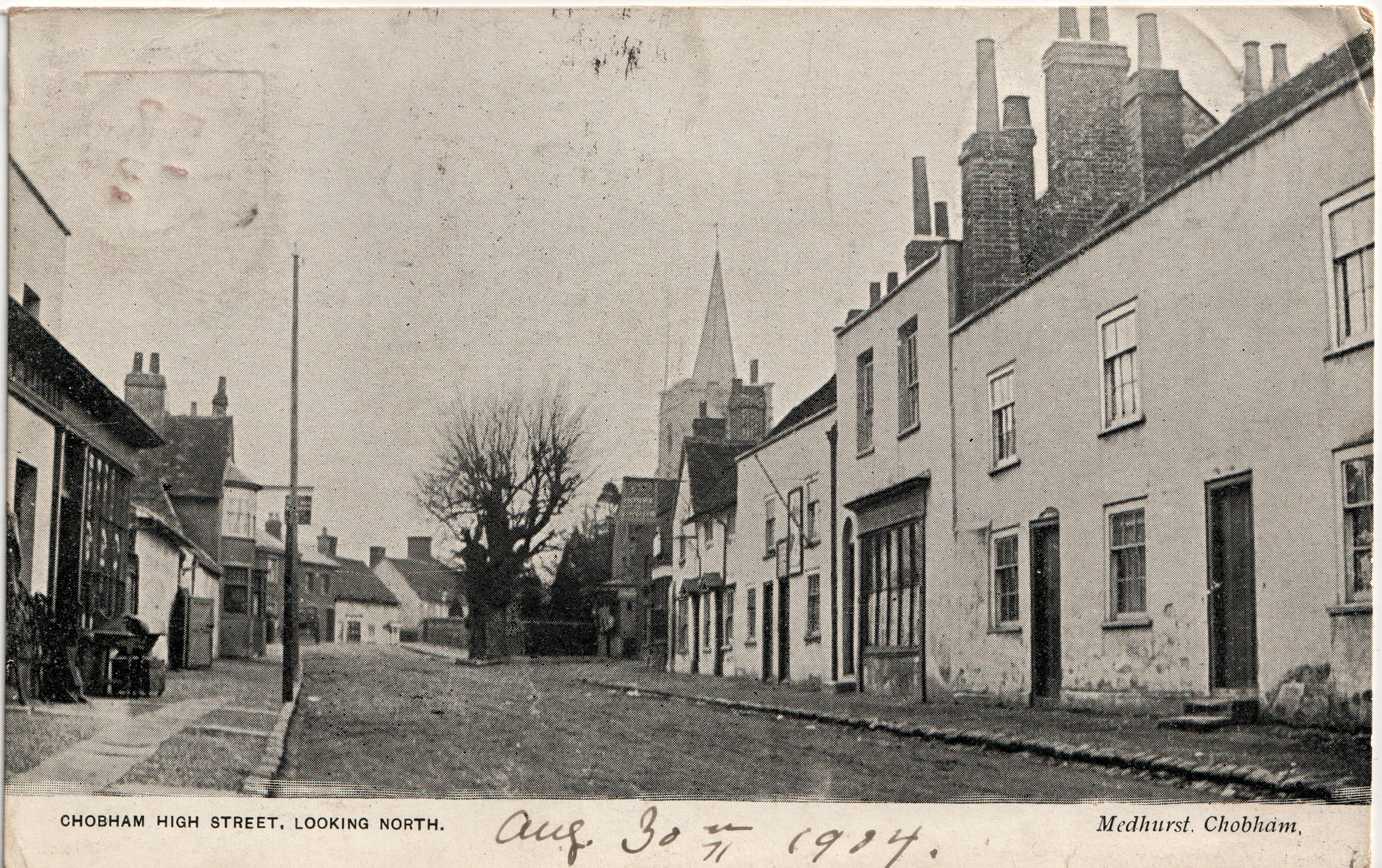
Chobham High Street, looking North, about 1904

=== Landmarks ===
Chobham Place or Manor

No property in the parish possessed as much land as a medieval manor would have had, since the dues of the whole parish before the English Reformation belonged to ecclesiastical landowners. However, some expansion in building and a modest amount of farming resulted from the presence of two lines of baronets: the Abdy baronets and Le Marchant baronets. The buildings and estate no longer survive.

John Cordrey, the last Abbot of Chertsey, surrendered the possessions of the Abbey to the crown in the reign of Henry VIII, and in July 1558, under Queen Mary I of England, the crown sold a parcel of land for £3,000 to Nicholas Heath, Archbishop of York and Lord Chancellor. The land was inclosed by a pale, whence it was called a park, and is marked as such in Norden and Speed's map of 1610. This grant was confirmed by Queen Elizabeth, but as Heath was later deprived for refusing the statutory oaths, the nominal ownership was conveyed to his brother William in 1564. The former archbishop continued, however, to reside when his nephew Thomas forfeited his new lands in 1588. Later they were restored, and in 1606 sold to Francis Leigh. The Cope, Hale and Henn families held the lands until 1681. The Martin and Crawley families held them until the time when Mr Revel, M.P. 1734–52, is said to have been the owner. In 1758, his daughter and heiress married Sir George Warren, and in 1777 their daughter married Thomas Bulkeley, 7th Viscount Bulkeley. The latter died in 1822, leaving the land to Sir Richard Williams-Bulkeley, 10th Baronet, after which now reduced in area, it was acquired by the Le Marchant baronets.

Chobham House, Aden, or Ardern Manor

By 1911, Chobham House, which built in the 16th century as the home of minor local gentry, was only represented by a small farm-house. John Ardern held land in Chobham in 1331 and in 1540 this was held by John Danaster 'seized of the manor', baron of the Exchequer, his heiress daughter married a son of the wealthy Sir Edward Bray of Shere, a name later significant in local events and architecture.

Vicarage

The vicarage was built in 1811 by the Rev. Charles Jerram, vicar 1810–34. Jerram was a noted tutor whose pupils included Lord Teignmouth and Horace Mann.

Penny Pot or Pentecost

A court roll of the time of Charles II mentions 'Stanners' and 'Pentecost' as tythings (presenting tythingmen). Pennypot Cottage, dating to the 17th century, situated on the long Pennypot Lane, is a Grade II listed building.

Brook Place

Brook Place, also known as Malt House, is a Grade II*-listed building is dated "W B[ray] 1656". It was built in the Artisan Mannerist style and was mentioned as fine architecture in the History of Surrey in 1809 by Manning and Bray. In 1648 this house's predecessor was the property of Edward Bray, a descendant of the Shiere family, who paid composition for his estate as a Royalist. It belonged to the manor of Aden (locally always pronounced Ardern) linked to Worplesdon but was not the manor house.

Others

In 1911 Broadford (House) was the residence of Sir Charles George Walpole and Highams, formerly occupied by Lord Bagot was the estate of Mrs Leschallas.

=== Chobham armour ===
Chobham became known for the development represented by its tank factory and testing ground, producing Chobham armour. The terrain was carved out of Chobham Common.

== Economy ==
1% of the population at the 2011 census (15 people) were employed in agriculture, forestry and fishing sector in 2011. The largest sectors of employment were Wholesale and Retail Trade; Repair of Motor Vehicles and Motor Cycles and Professional, Scientific and Technical Activities at 15% and 11% of the population respectively. Construction, manufacturing, education and health or social work, closely compete for 8% of the labour force.

== Amenities ==
The array of shops, repair garages, motor outlets and leisure services is diverse, however most international branded clothes shops and larger supermarkets are further afield. The following types of outlets are well-represented:

- Antiques Shops
- Car dealerships
- Motorbicycle dealerships
- Giftshops
- Garden/outdoor living centres and seed stores
- Restaurants

== Sports and leisure ==
Chobham F.C. were members of the Combined Counties Football League until the end of the 2010–11 season, when they were relegated to the Surrey Elite Intermediate League.

Chobham Rugby Club is a community rugby club with more than 2,000 members.

Chobham has a Cricket club that run 3 League teams on a Saturday and a social side on a Sunday.

Chobham & District Rifle Club celebrated its centenary in 2009. The highpoint of the shooting year is in August when the British Championships are held at Bisley.

== Geography ==
=== Soil and elevation ===
Soil

The village and hamlets are chiefly on the gravel and alluvium of the stream beds, but the rest of the pre-1968 drawn parish of 9,057 acres (3,665 ha) is on the Bagshot Sands ('Formation'), with extensive peat beds.

Elevation

The Chobham Ridges rise to the west of West End to a long ridge which bounds Camberley, at 110–120 metres (360–390 ft), and Staple Hill to the north rises to 87 metres (285 ft).

The River Bourne and its northern tributary, the Hale, Mill Bourne or Windle Brook run through the village. These can flood small but well-developed parts of the village in extreme localised rainfall.

The rolling basin below reaches lowest elevations of between 30 metres (98 ft) in the centre of the west and 20 metres (66 ft) where the rivers join in the centre of the east. The rivers at the western point are less than 100 metres (330 ft) apart; to the east end of the parish where the parish adjoins the landscape of the McLaren Technology Centre the rivers are finally merged along that boundary.

== Demography ==
It is not accurate to compare pre 1961 and post-1971 sets of statistics due to different borders, excluding principally West End, Surrey but also other minor neighbourhoods, smaller than villages, which left the civil parish during that period.

In 2011 the population lived in 1,616 households compared to 20 fewer in 2001, however the population had declined by one, which contrasts with the increase in the historic, more heavily populated part of the parish which seceded in 1968 from Chobham. This involved 1,454 acres (588 ha), leaving Chobham with, in 2001, for example 2,313 acres (936 ha).

Historic population of Chobham

Year	Pop.
1801	1,176
1811	1,329
1821	1,719
1831	1,937
1841	1,989

Year	Pop.
1851	2,069
1881	2,499
1891	3,009
1901	3,186
1911	3,991

Year	Pop.
1921	4,085
1931	4,724
1941	n/a
1951	6,533
1961	7,196*

Year	Pop.
2001	3,800
2011	3,799

2011 Census Homes
Output area	Detached	Semi-detached	Terraced	Flats and apartments	Caravans/temporary/mobile homes	shared between households
(Civil Parish)	891	425	158	134	8	0

The average level of accommodation in the region composed of detached houses was 28%, the average that was apartments was 22.6%.

2011 Census Key Statistics
Output area	Population	Households	% Owned outright	% Owned with a loan	hectares
(Civil Parish)	3,799	1,616	43.4%	36.2%	2,313

The proportion of households in the civil parish who owned their home outright compares to the regional average of 35.1%. The proportion who owned their home with a loan compares to the regional average of 32.5%. The remaining percent is made up of rented dwellings (plus a negligible percentage of households living rent-free).

== Localities ==
=== Burrowhill ===
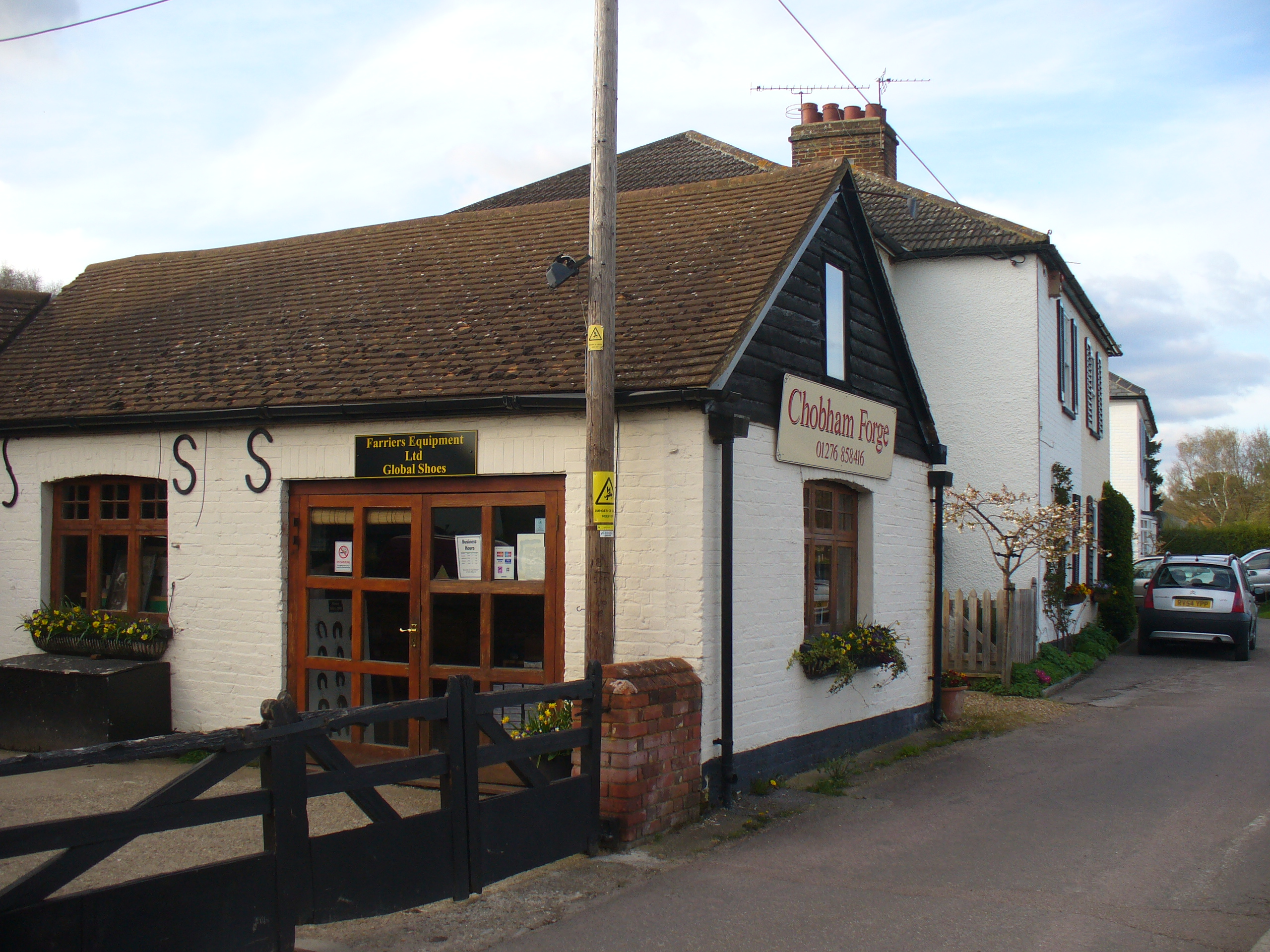
Chobham Forge

Burrowhill the neighbourhood of the north of the village broken up from the village centre by Wishmore Cross School but is linked to it by two residential roads, one of which is a local through road from Chobham to Sunningdale. There is a Farrier at Chobham Forge, two pubs and two restaurants.

=== Coxhill Green or Mimbridge ===
This south-eastern semi-rural village has a network of single carriageway roads with many farms, and fewer homes than Burrowhill many of which amount to smallholdings. It is separated by a wider green buffer than the other localities and adjoins Horsell Common, which is a wooded and open space separating it from the well-developed and former village and suburb of Woking, Horsell which has a longer and wider parade of shops than Chobham. The southern boundary is the Bourne which rises in Bisley a few kilometres to the west well before it has merged with the larger Mill Bourne flowing from the north of the village and rising in Berkshire.

=== Penny Pot, Broadford and Castle Green ===
These south-western and southern lightly populated linear settlements are narrowly separated from the village centre by a farmed field. Castle Green has overflowed along Guildford Road, which splits off from the old road to the Fellow Green part of West End, in the Borough of Woking.

=== Valley End ===
Most of the land of this northernmost hamlet lies north of the M3 motorway which bisects it and its church and main cluster of buildings is on the opposite side. Its church is currently described by the Church of England as 'the church off the beaten track'. This is Grade II listed, built in 1867 from designs by G.F. Bodley and built in red and brown brick with stone dressed windows.

== Notable residents ==
- James Pickering Kendall born here
- Peter Gabriel of the band Genesis was born here.
- Simon Posford aka Hallucinogen was born here.
- Nicholas Heath, Archbishop of York and Lord Chancellor of England (buried here)
- John William Navin Sullivan, the popular science writer and literary journalist, lived and worked for some years at Paradise Farm, He died there in August 1937 and is buried at Brookwood Cemetery.
- Graham Mitchell, former Deputy Director General of the Security Services MI5 during the period 1956–1963 lived in a large house on the edge of Chobham Common, Chobham, Surrey. He took early retirement in 1963 under a cloud of suspicion that he was a Soviet agent.
- King Constantine II resided in Chobham during the first 2 years of his exile from Greece.
- Thomas of Chobham, theologian and subdean of Salisbury, was born here.
- Emma Kennedy, writer and comedian joined the Parish Council in 2021.
- Charlotte Jordan, actress who portrays Daisy Midgeley on Coronation Street was born here.
