= Bagshot =

Village and parish in Surrey, England

Coordinates: 51.3607°N 0.6982°W

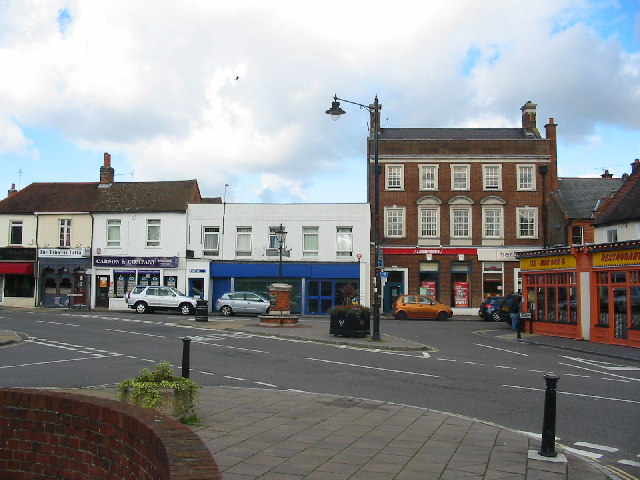

- Location within Surrey
- Population: 7,500 (2022 ONS Estimate)
- OS grid reference: SU907632
- District: Surrey Heath
- Shire county: Surrey
- Region: South East
- Country: England
- Sovereign state: United Kingdom
- Post town: Bagshot
- Postcode district: GU19
- Dialling code: 01276
- Police: Surrey
- Fire: Surrey
- Ambulance: South East Coast
- UK Parliament: Surrey Heath

Bagshot is a large village in the Surrey Heath borough of Surrey, England, approximately 27 miles (43 km) southwest of central London. In the past, Bagshot served as an important staging post between London, Southampton and the West Country, evidenced by the original coaching inns still present in the village today.

Much of the land surrounding Bagshot is owned by the Ministry of Defence. The village is adjacent to junction 3 of the M3 motorway. Bagshot railway station is on the line between Ascot and Aldershot and train services are run by South Western Railway

Bagshot is part of the civil parish of Windlesham, which has a population of 17,000 and also includes the neighbouring village of Lightwater.

== History ==
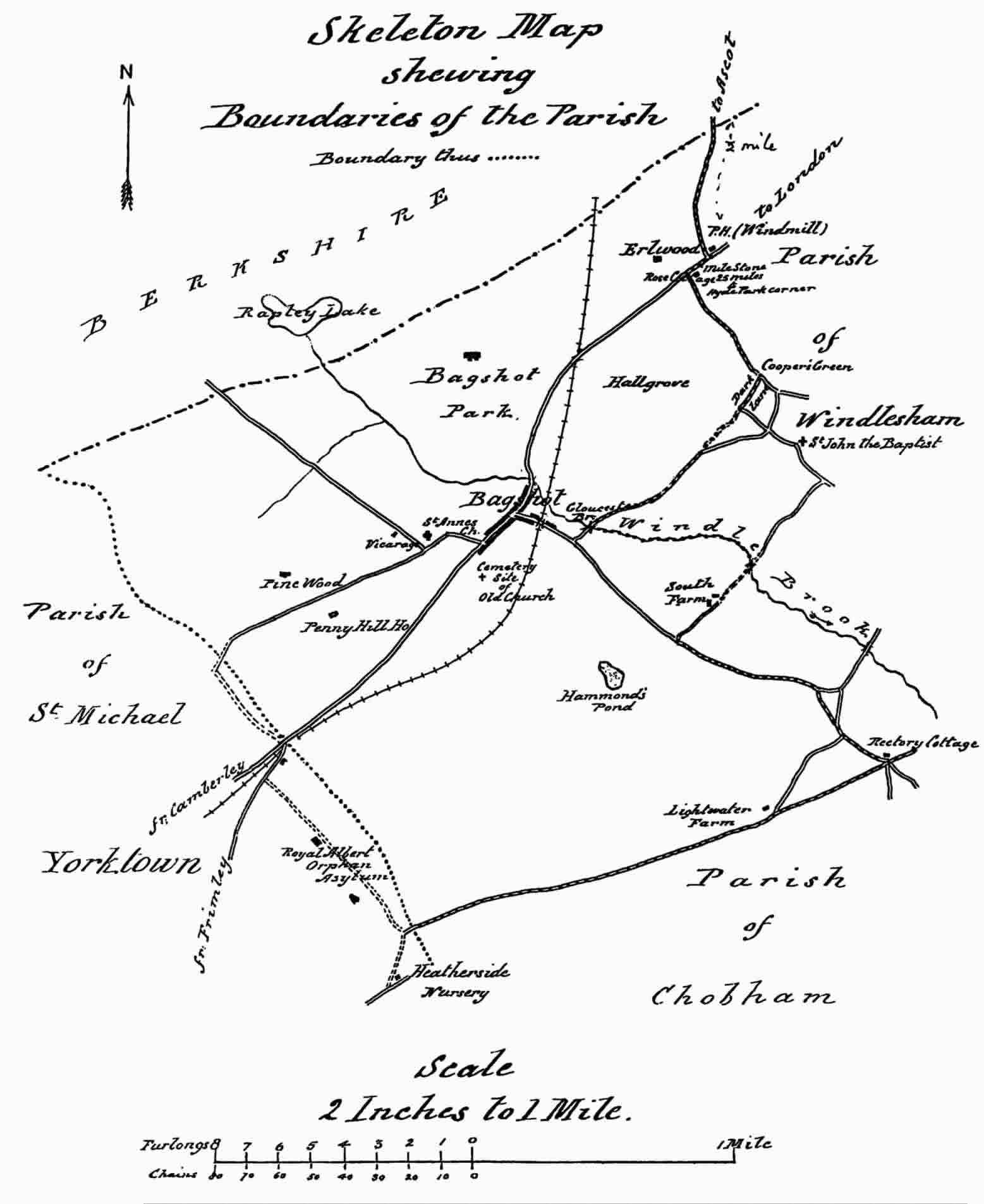
An 1890 map of the Windlesham Parish area

The place-name 'Bagshot' is first attested in the Pipe Rolls of 1165, where it appears as Bagsheta. It was the name of a wood, and may have meant 'Bacga's wood'.

Recent excavations have shown that settlements of Bagshot date back as far as pre-Roman; before these excavations it was thought that the earliest settlements in Bagshot were late Saxon. Late Bronze Age settlements have been identified in the area, and iron smelting appears to have been a major 'industry' in the locality. Bagshot at one time included a Royal forest. It had a Royal hunting lodge certainly through Stuart and Tudor times, now called Bagshot Park, which is now the residence of Prince Edward, Duke of Edinburgh.

In Elizabethan times (late 16th century) Bagshot prospered due to its position on the main London to the West Country road (The Great South West Road, now classified as the A30). As with many villages on main coaching routes, Bagshot developed services, inns for the stagecoach passengers, and stables to provide the coaches with fresh horses. Ann Nelson's "Exeter Telegraph" would stop for 20 minutes at Bagshot on its 17 hour journey to Devon.

The prosperity of the Great South West Road created its share of highwaymen, one of the most notorious being William Davis, a local farmer who lived near what is known locally as the Jolly Farmer roundabout in Camberley. He was eventually caught at the White Hart Inn in Bagshot and later was hanged at the gallows in Gibbets Lane in Camberley. Not one to avoid suspicion, he always paid his debts in gold! It was after him that the pub was called the Golden Farmer. The Golden Farmer (now Jolly Farmer), was eventually sold to American Golf Discount Store, who still use the old building.

== Churches ==
Bagshot has four churches: Church of England (St. Anne's); Roman Catholic (Christ the King); Methodist, Evangelical (Brook Church).

St Anne's Church was built in 1884 in a Gothic Revival style under the patronage of Prince Arthur, Duke of Connaught who lived in the nearby Bagshot Park. It is a building in red brick with stone detail under a slate roof. The east window was dedicated in memory of Prince Arthur's youngest brother Prince Leopold, Duke of Albany (died 1884). There is a bell tower with a peal of eight bells. It is a grade II listed building and is situated in a conservation area.

== Sport and leisure ==
Bagshot has two multi-purpose sports fields and a cricket field.

Curley Park Rangers, the youth football club, meet regularly and play on pitches in both Lightwater and Bagshot. The CPR clubhouse is located at the Bagshot pitch.

White Hart Royals, the football team of the White Hart pub in Bagshot village, compete in the Camberley & District Sunday Football League.

Bagshot Cricket Club runs a number of adult and under 16 teams and complete in the Thames Valley League, the Three Counties League and the West Surrey Youth League.

Bagshot Tennis Club has four floodlit courts and fields teams in the Woking League.

Swinley Forest, which borders Bagshot to the north, provides some of the best mountain biking in South-East England, with many off-road 'single-track' trails available as well as plenty of fire roads. Mountain biking and walking is free. Swinley Woods was considered as a venue for the mountain biking event of the 2012 Summer Olympics.

Other clubs and organisations include Bagshot Concert Band, the Surrey Heath Archaeology and Heritage Trust, Bagshot Gymnastics Club, Camberley and Bagshot Metal Detecting Club and local branches of the Scouts, Royal Air Forces Association, Women's Institute and Camberley Rifle & Pistol Club. It is also a short distance from The National Clay Shooting Centre and the Bisley shooting ranges.

Bagshot Village Community Library is situated on the High Street and in addition to the usual library services provides Story and 'Rhymetimes' for the local toddler community.

Lightwater Country Park is accessible by crossing the M3 footbridge - an old footbridge was demolished in 2023, before a new replacement footbridge opened in August 2025

== Today ==
Pennyhill Park Hotel located at the far western edge of Bagshot is where the England rugby team train. Bagshot Park, home of Prince Edward, Duke of Edinburgh is located on the northern edge of the village. The A30 leaving Bagshot to the southwest for Camberley has a large roundabout on it called the Jolly Farmer after a public house that used to stand in its centre, now used as a Golfing Store.

The local borough, Surrey Heath, was mainly a Conservative area, and the council had been led by the Conservatives from its founding in 1974 until the Liberal Democrats captured a majority in the 2023 local election. Bagshot itself is, however, represented by one Liberal Democrat and two Conservative borough councillors. At the 2024 General election, the [Surrey Heath UK Parliamentary constituency] also voted for Professor Al Pinkerton of the Liberal Democrats who gained a majority of 5640 over the Conservatives.

== Notable people ==
- Brian May (born 1947), English musician, lead guitarist of Queen, with a famous guitar store in Bagshot
- Steve Backshall (born 1973), English naturalist and television presenter
- Moiya Kelly (1934–2023), English actress
