= Lightwater =

Village in Surrey, England

Coordinates: 51.3506°N 0.6672°W

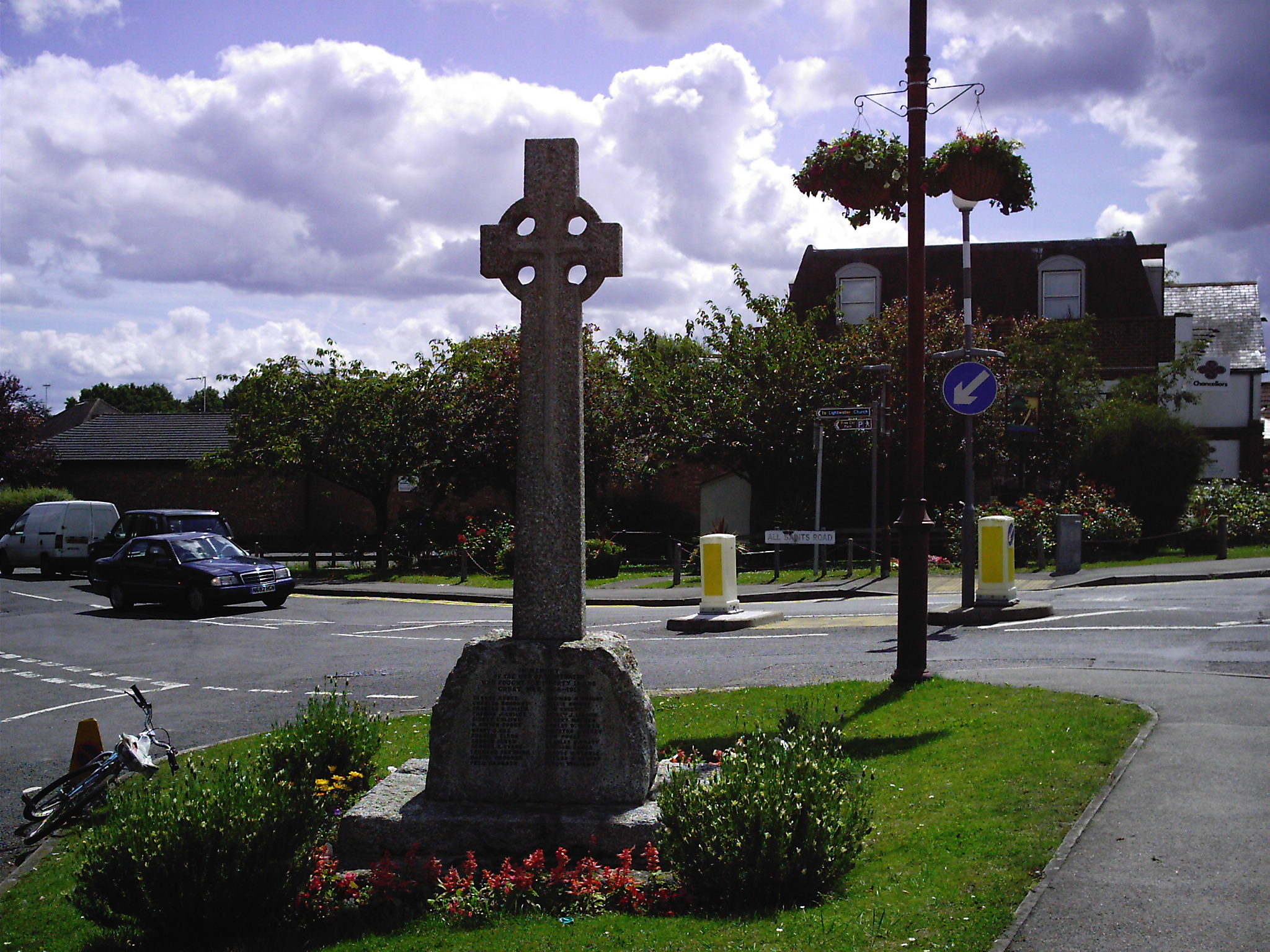
- Lightwater war memorial and rose garden

- Location within Surrey
- Population: 6,500 ▼ (2021 Census) 2011: 7,000 (2011 Census. Ward)
- OS grid reference: SU929621
- District: Surrey Heath
- Shire county: Surrey
- Region: South East
- Country: England
- Sovereign state: United Kingdom
- Post town: LIGHTWATER
- Postcode district: GU18
- Dialling code: 01276
- Police: Surrey
- Fire: Surrey
- Ambulance: South East Coast
- UK Parliament: Surrey Heath

Lightwater is a village in the Surrey Heath district of Surrey, England, about 27 miles (43 km) southwest of central London. Immediately surrounding towns and villages include Bagshot, Deepcut, Windlesham, Camberley, and West End, Woking. It is bounded to the north-west by the M3 motorway and to the north-east by the "Lightwater Bypass" (A322). To the south-east it is bounded by the "Red Road" (B311), while to the south-west there are vehicle-testing tracks owned by the Ministry of Defence.

The village is adjacent to junction 3 of the M3 motorway. The nearest railway station is at Bagshot, on the line between Ascot and Aldershot. Lightwater is part of the civil parish of Windlesham, which has a population of 17,000 and also includes the neighbouring village of Bagshot. The village has a population of 6,500 as of the 2021 census, down from 7,000 in 2011.

Since April of 2025, Lightwater has been home to the oldest living person, Ethel Caterham, a supercentenarian aged 117 years, 51 days old, after previous oldest living person Inah Canabarro Lucas died at the age of 116. Caterham has lived in a Lightwater care home since 2020, and in celebration for her 116th birthday was visited on 18 September 2025 by Charles III. Caterham is the last known surviving individual born in the 1900s decade.

== History ==
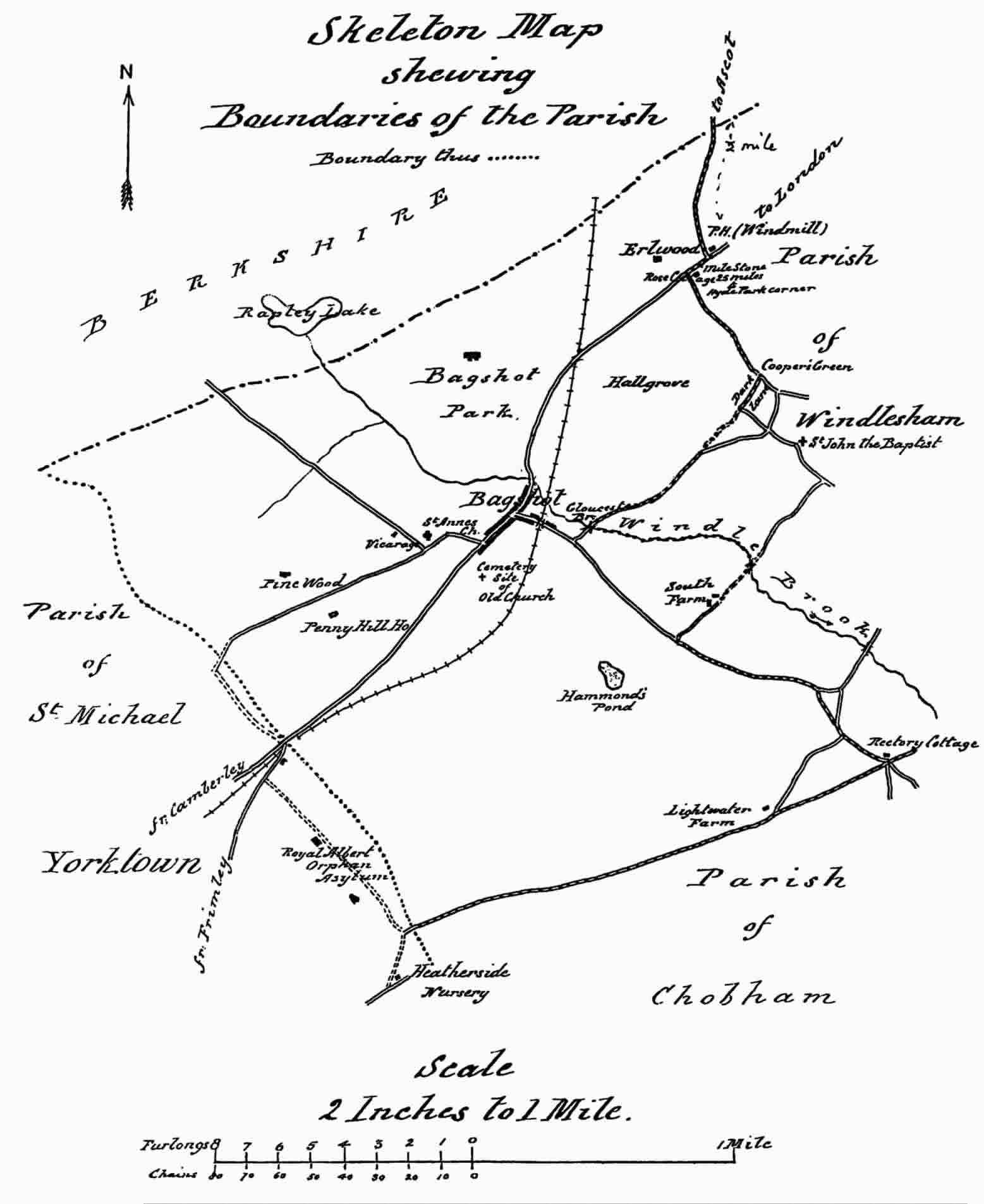
An 1890 map of the locality

=== Development ===
Prior to development, the natural vegetation was part of the Surrey heathland as seen in Bagshot and Chobham Common. The region has been inhabited since pre-historic times with tumuli in the heathland to the south of the village.

In modern times, Lightwater grew as a place with holiday homes in a chalet style for people living in London. Since 1960 it has grown rapidly, with housing estates proliferating in the area just north of Red Road and the military ranges around Greyspot.

=== Facilities ===
The town has full medical facilities, a library, pub, a post office, a range of shops and a petrol station.

=== Transport ===
Despite Lightwater being larger in size, the nearest railway station is at Bagshot. This reflects the fact that Bagshot used to be a more important town as a staging post on journeys from London to Southampton and the West Country. Lightwater has grown in size as a dormitory settlement in recent times. In the adjacent 1890s map of the area, Bagshot is a notable town while Lightwater is noted as just a farm.

== Notable people ==
- Ethel Caterham, a Supercentenarian, and current oldest living person, aged 117 years, 51 days old. The last known surviving individual born in the 1900s decade, Caterham has lived in a care home in Lightwater since 2020. On 18 September 2025, Caterham met King Charles III.
- Brian Blessed, an actor, and appointed an Officer of the Order of the British Empire (OBE) for services to the arts and charity, lives in Lightwater. Blessed is also the oldest man to have reached the North Magnetic Pole on foot. In April 2024, Blessed was announced as ambassador to the 'Surrey Day' event, organised by BBC Radio Surrey, Visit Surrey, and the Surrey Lieutenancy.

== Lightwater Country Park ==
Lightwater has its own country park, with some 100 acres (0.40 km^{2}) of heathland, complete with "nature trail", together with a leisure centre and visitors centre. The park has a view point, called High Curley, which gives views of about 250 degrees. From this point Bracknell, Ascot Racecourse, the London skyline and Bagshot Park can be seen to the west of the M3.

== Sport ==
The local senior rugby club is Lightwater Rugby Club.

The largest local junior badminton club, Swifts, is accredited as a Badminton England Premier Club and is based at Lightwater Leisure Centre.
