= Surrey Heath =

Coordinates: 51.3395°N 0.7433°W

- Non-metropolitan district, borough
- Motto: Festina diligenter (Latin: Make haste carefully)
- Surrey Heath shown within Surrey
- Sovereign state: United Kingdom
- Constituent country: England
- Region: South East England
- Non-metropolitan county: Surrey
- Status: Non-metropolitan district
- Admin HQ: Camberley
- Incorporated: 1 April 1974

Government
  - Type: Non-metropolitan district council
  - Body: Surrey Heath Borough Council
  - MPs: Al Pinkerton (Lib Dem)

Area
  - Total: 36.7 sq mi (95.1 km^{2})
  - Rank: 202nd (of 296)

Population (2025)
  - Total: 95,094
  - Rank: 260th (of 296)
  - Density: 2,590/sq mi (1,000/km^{2})

Ethnicity (2021)
  - Ethnic groups: List: 85% White; 8.9% Asian; 2.7% Mixed; 1.8% other; 1.6% Black

Religion (2021)
  - Religion: List: 50% Christianity; 36% no religion; 5.7% not stated; 3.1% Islam; 2.2% Hinduism; 1.2% Sikhism; 1.1% Buddhism; 0.5% other; 0.2% Judaism
- Time zone: UTC0 (GMT)
  - Summer (DST): UTC+1 (BST)
- ONS code: 43UJ (ONS); E07000214 (GSS)
- OS grid reference: SU8752760851

Surrey Heath is a local government district with borough status in Surrey, England. Its council is based in Camberley. Much of the area is within the Metropolitan Green Belt.

The neighbouring districts are Runnymede, Woking, Guildford, Rushmoor, Hart, Bracknell Forest, and Windsor and Maidenhead.

== History ==
The district was formed on 1 April 1974 under the Local Government Act 1972. The new district covered the area of two former districts, which were both abolished at the same time:

- Frimley and Camberley Urban District
- Bagshot Rural District

The new district was named "Surrey Heath" in recognition of the extensive areas of heathland it contains, including Chobham Common and Lightwater Country Park, which form part of the wider Thames Basin Heaths. The new district was granted borough status from its creation, allowing the chair of the council to take the title of mayor.

In April 2025, Surrey Heath became home to the oldest living person, Ethel Caterham, a Supercentenarian aged 117 years, 76 days old, after previous oldest living person Inah Canabarro Lucas died at the age of 116. Caterham has lived in a Lightwater care home since 2020, and in celebration for her 116th birthday was visited on 18 September 2025 by Charles III. Caterham is the last known surviving individual born in the 1900s decade.

As part of upcoming structural changes to local government in England, the district will be abolished in April 2027 and the area will become part of the new unitary authority of West Surrey.

== Governance ==
Surrey Heath Borough Council

Type
- Type: Non-metropolitan district

Leadership
- Mayor: Cliff Betton, Liberal Democrat since 13 May 2026
- Leader: Shaun Macdonald, Liberal Democrat since 28 June 2023
- Chief Executive: Nick Steevens since 1 July 2024

Structure
- Seats: 35 councillors
- Political groups: Administration (23) Liberal Democrats (23) Other parties (11) Conservative (6) Independent (3) Labour (2) Green (1)

Elections
- First election: 7 June 1973
- Last election: 4 May 2023

Meeting place
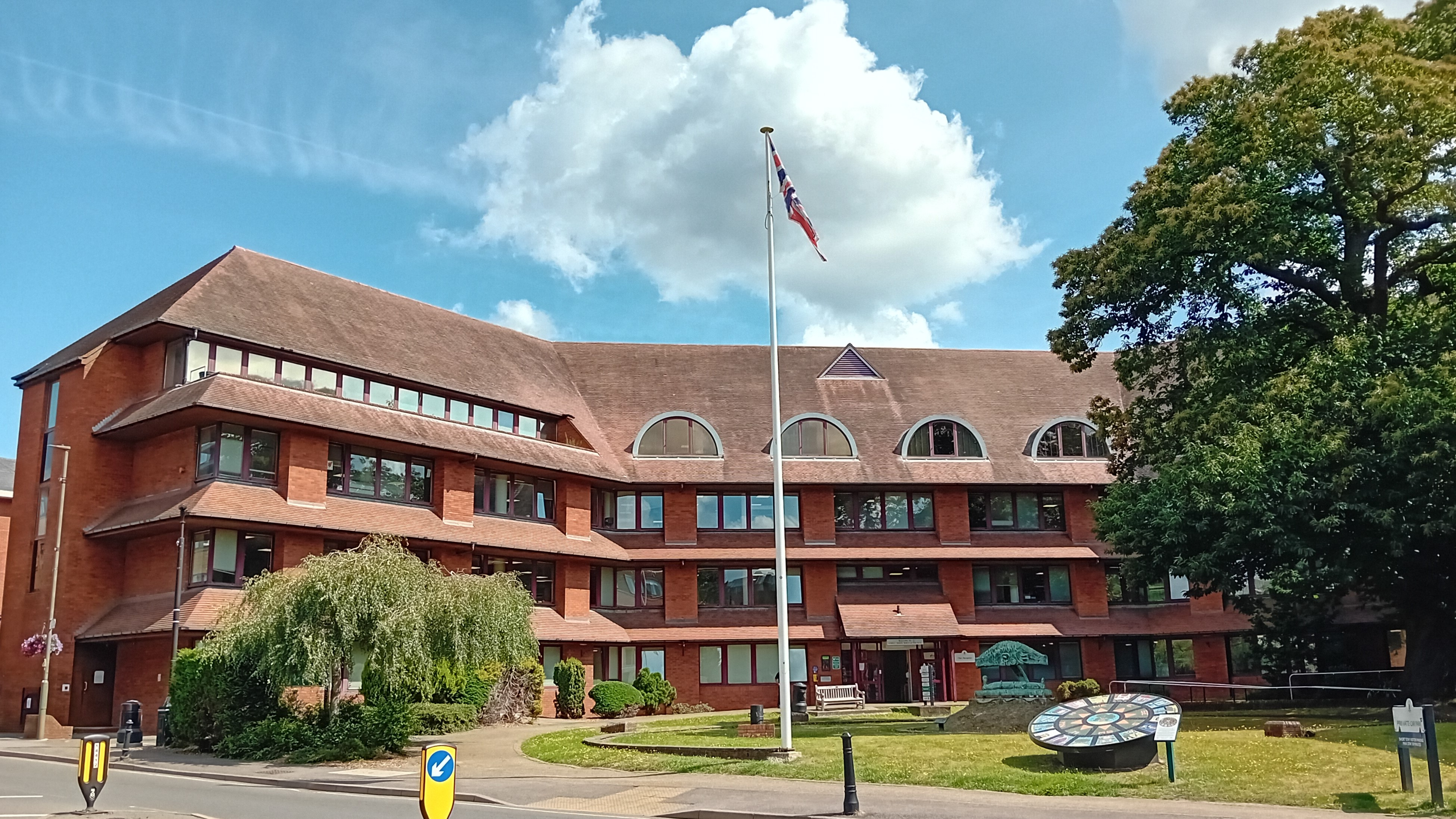
- Surrey Heath House, Knoll Road, Camberley, GU15 3HD

Website
- www.surreyheath.gov.uk

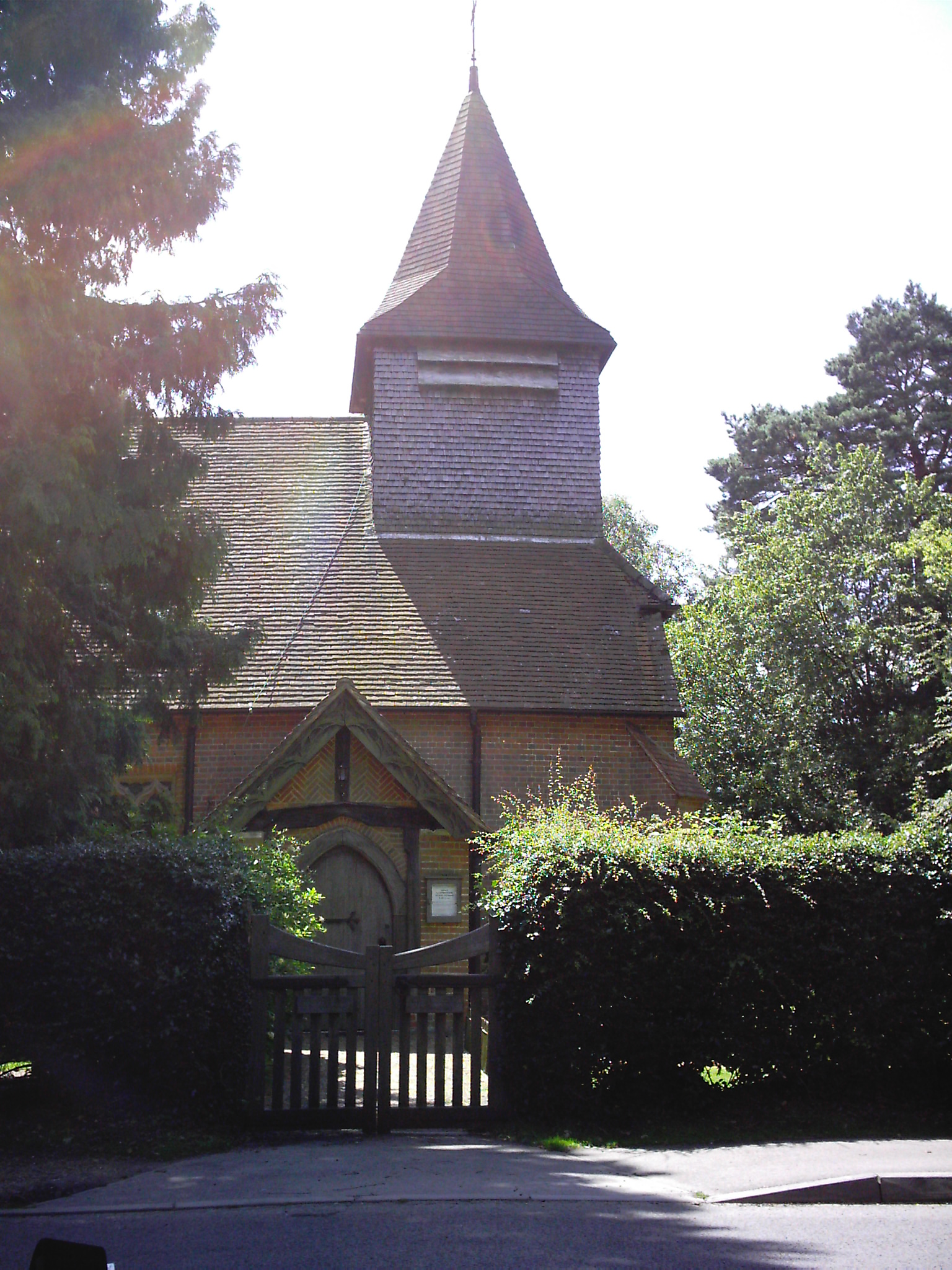
St Saviour's Church, Valley End, Chobham

Surrey Heath Borough Council provides district-level services. County-level services are provided by Surrey County Council. The eastern part of the borough is also covered by civil parishes, which form a third tier of local government.

=== Political control ===
Since the 2023 election the council has been under Liberal Democrat majority control. Prior to 2023 the council had been led by Conservatives from its creation in 1974.

The first election to the council was held in 1973, initially operating as a shadow authority alongside the outgoing authorities until the new arrangements came into effect on 1 April 1974. Political control of the council since 1974 has been as follows:

Party in control	Years
Conservative	1974–2020
No overall control	2020–2021
Conservative	2021–2022
No overall control	2022–2023
Liberal Democrats	2023–present

=== Leadership ===
The role of mayor is largely ceremonial in Surrey Heath. Political leadership is instead provided by the leader of the council. The leaders since 1994 have been:

Councillor	Party	From	To
Vivienne Chapman	Conservative	1994	1998
Moira Gibson	Conservative	27 May 1998	26 Feb 2019
Richard Brooks	Conservative	27 Feb 2019	20 Jan 2020
Alan McClafferty	Conservative	29 Jan 2020	May 2023
David Whitcroft	Liberal Democrats	17 May 2023	28 Jun 2023
Shaun Macdonald	Liberal Democrats	28 Jun 2023	

=== Composition ===
Following the 2023 election (including a postponed election in one ward) and subsequent changes up to July 2025, the composition of the council was:

Party	Councillors
Liberal Democrats	23
Conservative	6
Labour	2
Green	1
Independent	3
Total	35

The three independent councillors sit together as "The Community Group".

=== Premises ===
The council is based at Surrey Heath House on Knoll Road in Camberley. The building was purpose-built for the council for £4.25m and was completed in 1987. The building was formally opened by Valerian Wellesley, Duke of Wellington on 17 July 1987.

=== Controversies ===
In 2016, the council bought The Square, the main shopping centre in the centre of Camberley, for £109 million. By early 2023, the centre was reportedly valued at only £30 million, and the rents being received did not cover the interest payments on the debts the council had incurred in buying it.

In 2020, the council's chief executive, Karen Whelan, resigned after an independent investigation found that a 30% increase in her remuneration during 2018–19 compared to the year before had been unlawfully approved by the former leader of the council, Moira Gibson.

== Geography ==
The area forms the heart of the heath that spans Esher, Oxshott, Weybridge, Wisley, all around Woking, Brookwood, Deepcut, Pirbright, Frimley, Lightwater, Camberley, Chobham Common, Virginia Water and Ottershaw. It is made up of naturally wet, very acid sandy and loamy soil, which is just 1.9% of English soil and 0.2% of Welsh soil, which gives rise to pines and coniferous landscapes, such as pioneered at Wentworth and Foxhills estate (now spa, hotel, restaurant and golf club) by pro-American independence statesman Charles James Fox. In geology it gives rise to the name, Bagshot Formation.

The western section of the district is largely urbanised, with heaths nonetheless providing substantial green buffer around Camberley, Lightwater, Deepcut, Frimley, Frimley Green and Mytchett. The east of the district is less urbanized, and contains Surrey Heath's four civil parishes:

- Bisley
- Chobham (includes Castle Green and Mimbridge)
- West End
- Windlesham (contains also Bagshot, Lightwater and Valley End).

The former Frimley and Camberley Urban District covering the west of the borough is an unparished area, governed directly by Surrey Heath Borough Council.

Within the borough there are five Sites of Special Scientific Interest, four of which are part of the Thames Basin Heaths Special Protection Area of European Importance as a habitat for certain endangered bird species; these make up some of the six Wildlife Reserves managed by Surrey Wildlife Trust in Surrey Heath.

== Elections ==
Since the last boundary changes in 2019 the council has comprised 35 councillors representing 14 wards, with each ward electing two or three councillors. Elections were held every four years.

Further borough council elections were cancelled in 2026, and an election for the new West Surrey Council was held instead. West Surrey Council will formally come into being and take over local government functions in the area on 1 April 2027, at which point Surrey Heath Borough Council and the borough of Surrey Heath will be abolished.

=== Wider politics ===
The whole borough lies within the Surrey Heath constituency. The constituency is slightly larger than the borough, including the Normandy and Pirbright ward of Guildford Borough Council.

In 2014, the British Election Study named Surrey Heath as the most right-wing constituency in the country.

== Notable people ==
- Simone Ashley, actress known for her role in the Netflix series Bridgerton and Sex education, was born in Camberley. However, Ashley's family moved to Beaconsfield where she attended grammar school and sixth form.
- Steve Backshall, naturalist, appointed Member of the Order of the British Empire (MBE) for services to charity and wildlife conservation, and television presenter best known for the BBC wildlife documentary series, Deadly..., was born in Bagshot.
- Ethel Caterham, a Supercentenarian, and current oldest living person, aged 117 years, 76 days old. The last known surviving individual born in the 1900s decade, Caterham has livied in a care home in Lightwater since 2020. On 18 September 2025, Caterham met King Charles III.
- Andrew Ridgeley, member of Wham! alongside George Michael, was born in Windlesham, Surrey.
- Brian Blessed, an actor, and appointed an Officer of the Order of the British Empire for services to the arts and charity, lives in Lightwater. Blessed is also the oldest man to have reached the North Magnetic Pole on foot. In April 2024, Blessed was announced as ambassador to the 'Surrey Day' event, organised by BBC Radio Surrey, Visit Surrey, and the Surrey Lieutenancy.
- Holly-Anne Hull, singer and actress, best known for representing the UK at the Eurovision Song Contest 2025 as a part of group Remember Monday with "What the Hell Just Happened?", was born in Camberley with the group meeting whilst studying at Sixth Form College, Farnborough.
- Carl Fletcher, football player and Plymouth Argyle F.C and Wales national football team captain, was born in Camberley.
- Alan "Howling Laud" Hope, leader of the Official Monster Raving Loony Party, was born in Mytchett.
- The Duke and Duchess of Edinburgh live at Bagshot Park with their family.
- Charlotte Jordan, actress known for portraying Daisy Midgeley in the ITV soap Coronation Street between 2020 and 2025.

== Twinning ==
Surrey Heath is twinned with Sucy-en-Brie, France, and Bietigheim-Bissingen, Germany.
