= M3 motorway (Great Britain) =

Major motorway in England

M3

- M3 highlighted in blue Shown with UK motorway network

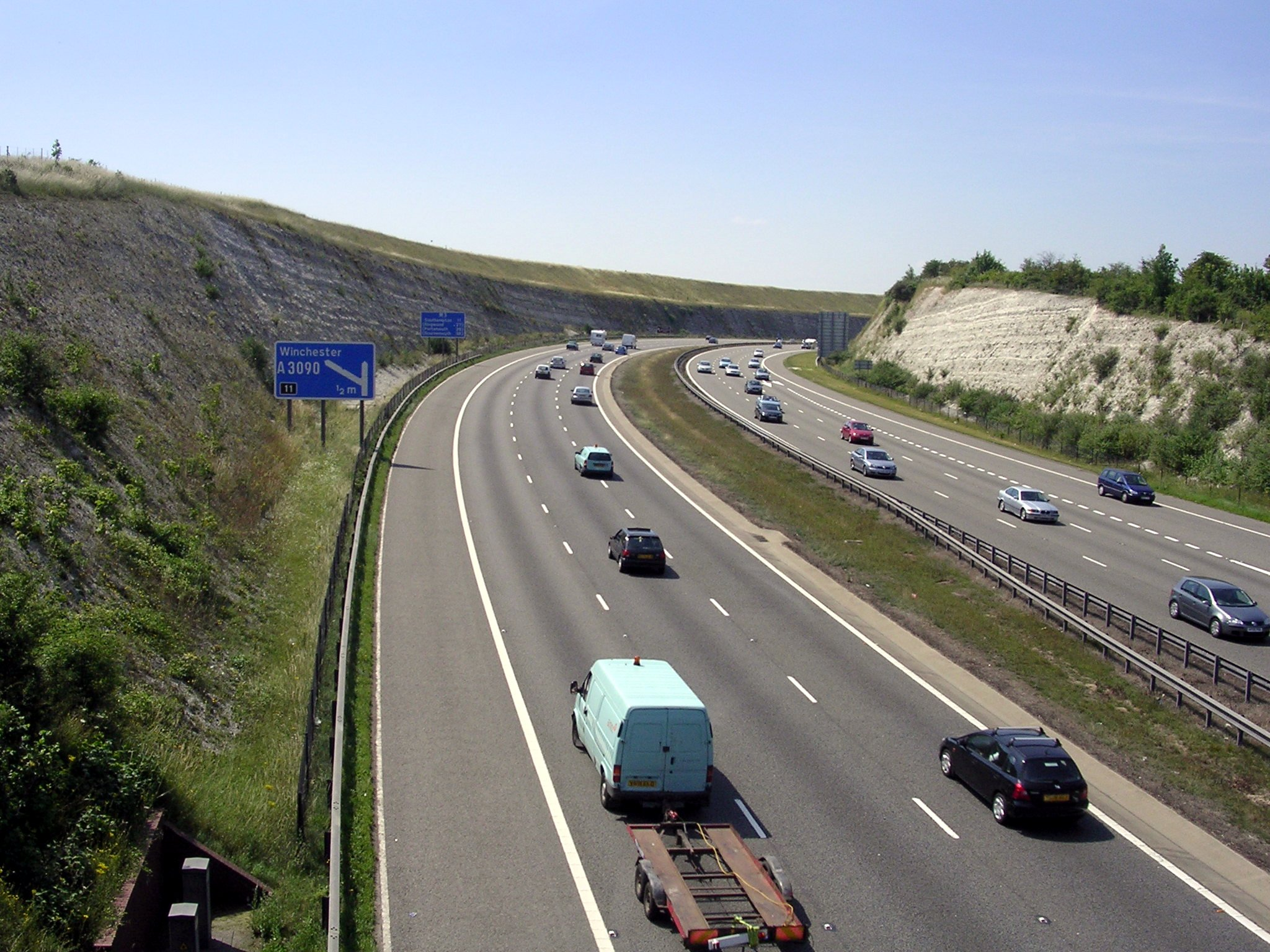
- Looking south at Twyford Down, 2006

Route information
- Part of E05
- Maintained by National Highways
- Length: 59 mi (95 km)
- Existed: 1971–present
- History: Opened: 1971; Completed: 1995

Major junctions
- Northeast end: Sunbury-on-Thames; 51.4166°N 0.4240°W
- J2 → M25 motorway; J14 → M27 motorway
- Southwest end: Chilworth; 50.9545°N 1.4081°W

Location
- Country: United Kingdom
- Counties: Surrey, Hampshire
- Primary destinations: London; Bracknell; Aldershot; Basingstoke; Winchester; Southampton; Reading; Newbury

Road network
- Roads in the United Kingdom; Motorways; A and B road zones
← M2	→ M4

The M3 is a motorway in England, from Sunbury-on-Thames, Surrey, to Eastleigh, Hampshire; a distance of approximately 59 miles (95 km). The route includes the Aldershot Urban Area, Basingstoke, Winchester, and Southampton.

It was constructed as a dual three-lane motorway except for its two-lane section between junction 8 (A303) and junction 9. The motorway was opened in phases, ranging from Lightwater/Bagshot to Popham in 1971 to Winchester to Otterbourne Hill in 1995. The latter stages attracted opposition from environmental campaigns across Britain due to its large cutting through wooded Twyford Down; numerous road protests were held which delayed its opening. Similar protests were avoided on the near-parallel A3 by the construction of the Hindhead Tunnel. Since completion, the motorway has been an artery to the west and midsections of the South Coast and Isle of Wight including for tourism. The major settlements nearest to the motorway are served by a railway also used for commuting but are relatively dispersed. Traffic on the M3 sees delays and congestion on its busiest sections near commuting hotspots and during holiday periods. From Chertsey to Fleet the road was in 2017 converted to a Smart Motorway, turning the hard shoulder into a permanent fourth lane with emergency refuge lay-bys.

== History ==
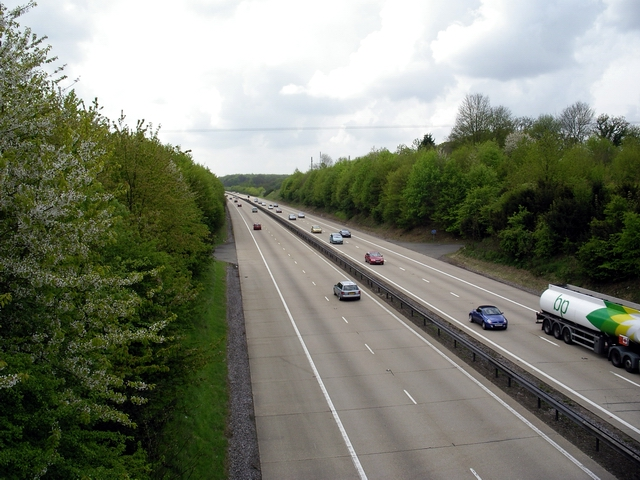
M3 motorway at East Stratton

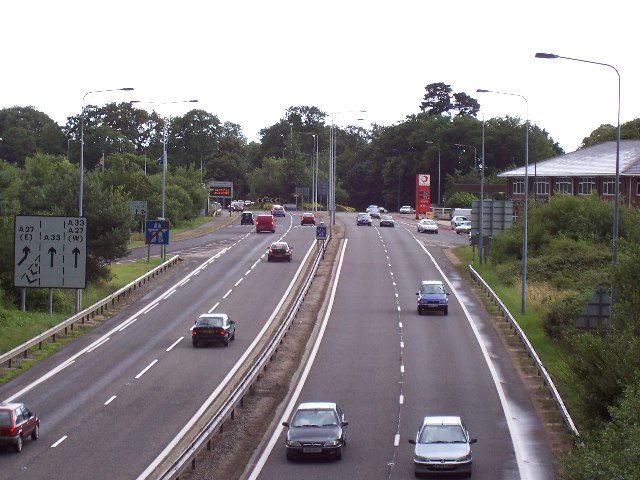
Southern end of the M3 meeting the A33 at Southampton

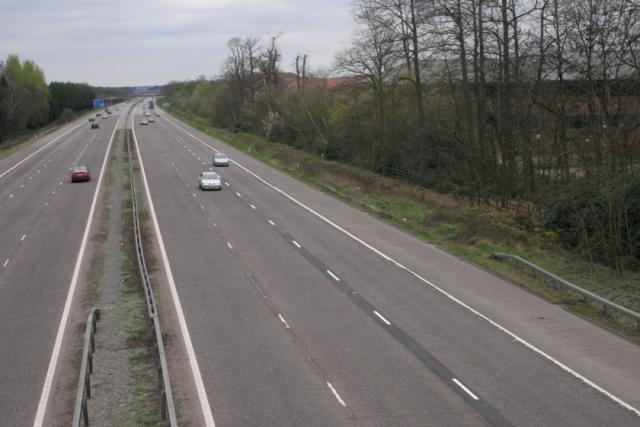
M3 motorway at Fleet

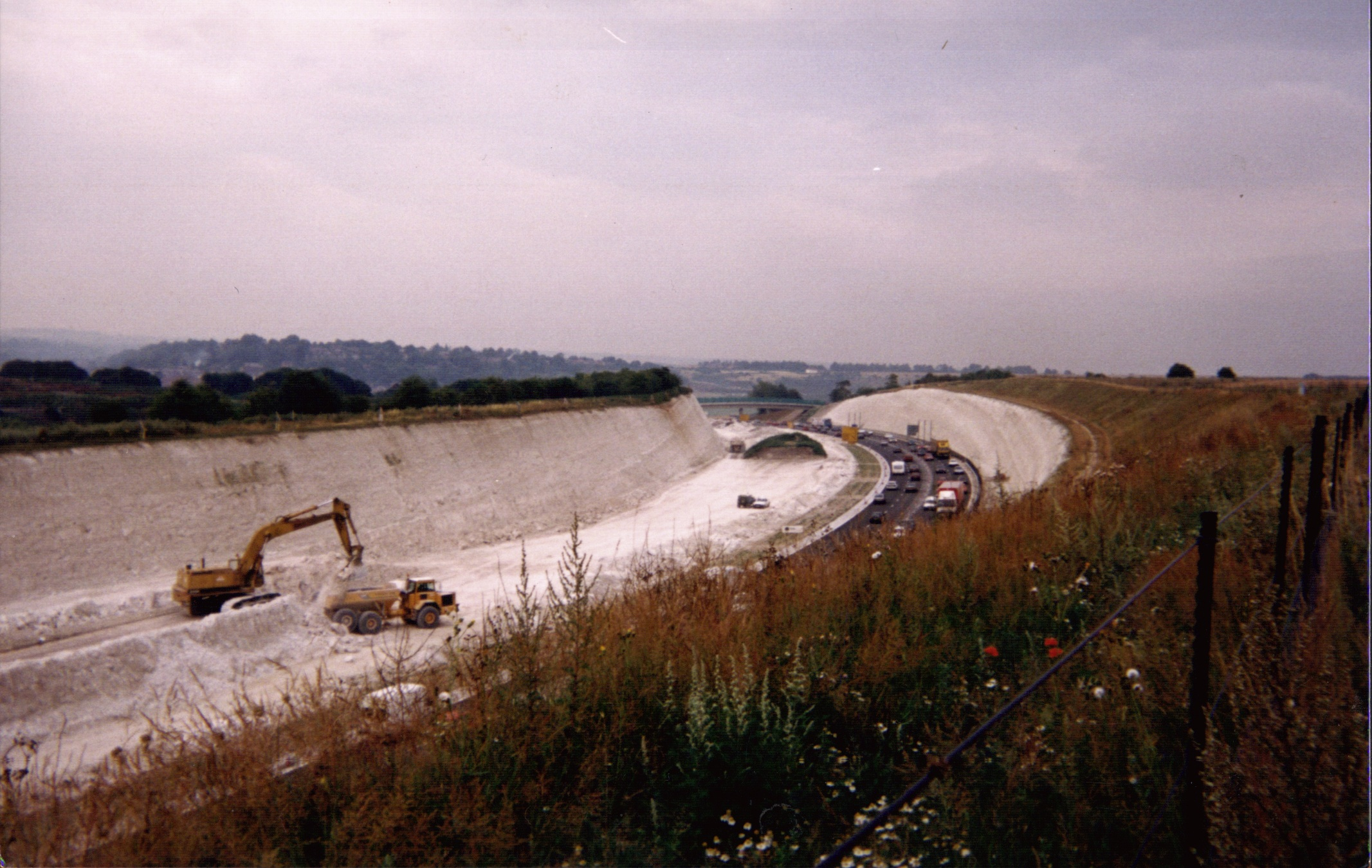
M3 under construction at Twyford Down

=== Proposals ===
In 1953 the proposed route was called the Great Chertsey Road. In 1960 the proposed route was known as the Chertsey Radial, also known as the Exeter Radial Motorway.

The motorway was planned from at least 1961. The route was surveyed from May 1962. The first route was published in early December 1964, and would be two lanes, along mostly the same route. The motorway would meet the South Orbital Road at Thorpe.

=== Planning ===
An official draft route was first published in early December 1964 by the Labour government, a forty-mile route from Sunbury. It would cost £25m, to be built by the early 1970s.

The Surrey Naturalists Trust (now Surrey Wildlife Trust) did not object to the M3 crossing Chobham Common, despite dividing the Common in half.

It was planned to take two-thirds of the traffic off the A30. The public enquiry was on Wednesday August 31 1966, held at RMA Sandhurst, until the end of September 1966. The final fixed route was published on June 16 1967.

The Sunbury Cross roundabout in south-west London was improved costing £600,000, from early 1966, before the motorway was built.

The motorway was originally approved as the "London to Basingstoke Motorway" with delays over funding for an extension to Southampton the road was built to relieve two single carriageway trunk roads that were congested. (Note: The A30 eastern stretch to the A303 road *The Winchester to Southampton traditional road, the A33)

In 1967, sections of the A33 from Popham, Hampshire, to a northeastern point of the Winchester Bypass were widened to dual carriageways; this only partially alleviated growing congestion, especially in Winchester, which led to the southern phase gaining approval. (Note: Of the A34 trunk road from Bicester on the M40 to Southampton)

== Construction ==
Construction started around early November 1968.

=== Sunbury to Lightwater ===
A E Farr built the Sunbury section, with the contract given in February 1971 for £12.7m, to take 33 months.

A E Farr was founded at Frinton-on-Sea in 1906, which moved to London in 1916, and was evacuated to Westbury, Wiltshire in 1942.

Sunbury opened at 1pm on Thursday July 11 1974. Hounslow Council had wanted the M3 extension not to open, until the A316 had been suitably improved.

=== Hawley to Lightwater ===
The 5.75-mile section cost £5,640,462, to take 2.5 years.

In mid-June 1969 a largely-intact Heinkel bomber aircraft was unearthed at Camberley by construction workers.

On Thursday December 11 1969 a 2,500lb German bomb was unearthed by workers. The B3103, near Fleet, was cordoned off.

=== Black Dam to Hawley ===
W. & C. French built the Black Dam to Hawley section from early 1969. The £9,176,968 contract was given in December 1968, being 13 miles, to take 28 months.

Structural cracks appeared in July 1970 at Hook. W. & C. French took the concrete beam manufacturer to court around 1975, due to three in four concrete beams had been found to have cracks, and claimed £700,000.

The section opened on Friday 18 June 1971.

=== Black Dam to Popham ===
The Popham section (the terminus until 1985) further east, being nine miles, opened on Friday May 28 1971.

=== Popham to Compton ===
It opened on Wednesday May 22 1985 at noon.

=== Kings Worthy ===
The penultimate section from Kings Worthy was built from 1990 by Mowlem.

== Sections ==
=== Eastern section ===
The eastern section, from Sunbury-on-Thames in Surrey to Popham near Basingstoke opened in sections: first the Hampshire section in 1971, and then the Surrey section in 1974. The cost for this first phase was £46m. The completed road acts were as a continuation of the A316 Country Way, an express three-lane road from Apex Corner, Hanworth, in Greater London to Sunbury-on-Thames.

The section is one of five routes into the southern half of London which reach Inner London with at least a dual-carriageway - or dual-direction - road, the others being the A3, the A30/A4, the A20 and A2. However approximately one mile before reaching Inner London it combines with the routes of the A30 and M4 approaches.

=== Southern section ===
A first public inquiry for the "M3 London to Basingstoke Motorway: Popham to Compton extension" centred on the section passing Winchester, and was held in 1971, after which the ministry was instructed to reconsider and reconsult on the proposals. A second public inquiry was held in 1976–77. The earlier decision to route the motorway through or alongside the water meadows between St Catherine's Hill and the compact cathedral city was reopened, and during the year-long inquiry the headmaster of Winchester College was forcibly ejected along with others for causing a disturbance.

The scope of the M3 extension was reduced to defer the difficult decision about the section around Winchester and it was built in two sections (from 'Popham to Bridget's Farm' and from 'Bridget's Farm to Bar End') in 1985. When this opened, the temporary junction to the A33 parallel route was removed.

The section of the M3 from near Junction 12 (Eastleigh and Chandler's Ford) to the last, Junction 14 for the M27 replaced part of the A33, which was upgraded to motorway standard and opened in 1991.

In 2008, the busiest section of the motorway, at Chandler's Ford, carried a daily average of around 130,000 vehicles.

The southern section starts as a continuation of a single-lane avenue, Bassett Avenue and The Avenue in the City of Southampton as the M27 provides alternative routes from other parts of the city, particularly its waterfront and downtown peak-hour accessway, the M271 motorway and Mountbatten Way providing dual to three lane highways starting at the northwest of the city.

=== Abandoned/suspended proposals ===
A service station was envisaged at Basingstoke upon the motorway's completion but not built – superseded by one just north of Fleet and another north of Winchester. Plans for a Basingstoke Services were again published in November 2017

=== Additions ===
An additional junction, numbered 4A, was opened in April 1992 for Fleet.

In March 1987, the new £5.63m junction 4a would start in January 1989. Construction started in March 1991 on a 65-week contract. On the weekend of January 18 1992 the bridge was built, closing the M3 from junctions 4 to 5. The junction opened on April 8 1992, being built by Costain, and opened two months early.

== Detailed route ==
The M3 starts at Sunbury-on-Thames in Surrey on the edge of South West London as the continuation of the A316 which has three lanes each way from Hanworth in the London Borough of Hounslow, and two from Chiswick. The motorway 2 miles (3.2 km) after its start turns more west-southwest, crosses the River Thames on the M3 Chertsey Bridge to the north of Chertsey and then has its second junction, at the M25 motorway, before continuing through the gorse, bogs and heather of the Surrey Heath. Its third junction is for Camberley, Bagshot, Bracknell, Ascot and Worplesdon. From Junction 4 it bisects the northern Blackwater Valley conurbation (Note: Main settlements: Farnborough, Aldershot, Camberley, Frimley, Farnham and Sandhurst) then has its latest junction for Fleet and nearby early 21st century expanded/new villages (Note: Examples include Elvetham Heath), it crosses the South West Main Line, before skirting Old Basing and Basingstoke to its north (Note: Here the M3 passes close to the Basingstoke Canal). Turning south west again, it passes Popham and, just before reaching Junction 8, where one lane becomes the A303 which leads to Exeter and South West England. From here the motorway continues as a dual two lane road through open countryside and Micheldever Wood until it reaches the north of Winchester.

Taking over the "Winchester Bypass" the M3 resumes to three lanes each way at Junction 9, continues directly south and then takes a small curve around the east of the city running through a deep cutting in Twyford Down and then proceeding south west again, crossing the South West Main Line a second time alongside the River Itchen and through the Eastleigh urban-suburban area before crossing the Eastleigh to Romsey railway line and ending at the Chilworth Roundabout on the edge of Southampton.

=== Road features ===
- The Spitfire Bridge carries the B3404 Alresford Road from Winchester over the M3 motorway and the parallel A272 (J9-J10 spur, known as the "Spitfire Link"). It replaced a concrete parabolic arch bridge under which a Curtiss P-40 had been flown by George Rogers in October 1941. It was generally assumed locally that the aircraft had been a Spitfire, hence the name.
- A private exit of the northern roundabout connected to Junction 4a provides access to the former UK headquarters of Sun Microsystems. As of 2018, this is now a new housing estate, Helios Park
- The section of the M3 between J2 and J4a has been converted into a smart motorway, with full opening on 30 June 2017.

== Incidents ==
- In the early morning of 25 April 1999, the drum and bass DJ and record producer Valerie Olukemi "Kemi" Olusanya, known as Kemistry, was killed on the M3 near Winchester by the steel body of a cat's eye, which had been dislodged by a van and flew through the windscreen of the following car in which she was a passenger. The object hit her in the face and killed her instantly. The coroner recorded a verdict of accidental death. A question was asked in the House of Lords about the safety of cat's eyes in light of the highly unusual incident, and the Highways Agency conducted an investigation into the "long-term integrity and performance" of various types of road stud.
- On 1 April 2000, a zebra crossing was illegally painted across the northbound carriageway of the M3 between Junctions 4 and 4a.
- On 23 September 2017, two firebombs were thrown from a bridge onto the motorway between junctions 9 and 11 by 17-year-old Nicholas Elger (who suffered from a psychiactric illness) leading to an 11-hour closure costing the economy an estimated £40 million. The attacker was identified after being linked to a bottle of Voss water used to transport the fuel. Elger told police he wished he had killed somebody and entered guilty pleas to two counts of arson recklessly endangering life.

== Junctions ==
Data from driver location signs are used to provide distance and carriageway identification information.

County	Location	mi	km	Jct	Destinations (NE-bound)	Destinations (SW-bound)	Notes
Surrey	Sunbury-on-Thames	15.0	24.2		A316 – Central London, Richmond		Continuation beyond A308
Surrey	Sunbury-on-Thames	15.3	24.6	1	A308 – Staines, Kingston, Sunbury		Northeastern terminus
Surrey	Thorpe–Chertsey boundary	21.3	34.2	2	M25 to M23 / M20 – Gatwick Airport M25 to M4 / M40 / M1 – Heathrow Airport, Watford, Staines	M25 to M23 / M20 / A320 – Gatwick Airport, Woking M25 to M4 / M40 / M1 – Heathrow Airport, Staines	
Surrey	Bagshot–Lightwater boundary	28.1	45.2	3	A322 – Woking, Bracknell	A322 – Bracknell, Lightwater	
Surrey–Hampshire boundary	Camberley–Farnborough boundary	32.6	52.5	4	A331 – Guildford, Farnham, Farnborough		
Hampshire	Farnborough–Blackwater and Hawley boundary	34.4	55.4	4A	A327 to A3013 – Farnborough, Fleet		
Hampshire	Hartley Wintney–Fleet			Fleet services			
Hampshire	Hook–Odiham boundary	41.9	67.4	5	A287 to B3349 – Hook		
Hampshire	Old Basing–Basingstoke boundary	46.6	75.0	6	A339 to A33 – Basingstoke, Newbury, Alton, Reading	A339 – Basingstoke, Alton	
Hampshire	Dummer	51.8	83.3	7	A30 – Basingstoke		
Hampshire	Dummer–Popham boundary	53.1	85.5	8	No access	A303 – The South West, Andover, Salisbury	Southwest-bound exit and northeast-bound entrance
Hampshire	Itchen Valley	59.9	96.4	Winchester services			
Hampshire	Winchester	63.9	102.8	9	A34 – The Midlands, Newbury	A272 – Winchester	
Hampshire	Winchester	65.2	105.0	10	A31 to B3330 – Alton, Winchester	No access	Northeast-bound exit and southwest-bound entrance
Hampshire	Twyford–Compton and Shawford boundary	67.2	108.1	11	A3090 – Winchester		
Hampshire	Eastleigh–Chandler's Ford boundary	70.0	112.6	12	A335 – Eastleigh	A335 – Eastleigh, Chandler's Ford	
Hampshire	Eastleigh–Chandler's Ford boundary			13	A335 – Eastleigh, Chandler's Ford	A335 – Eastleigh	
Hampshire	Eastleigh–Chandler's Ford–Chilworth boundary			13	No access	M27 west – Southampton Docks, Bournemouth	Southwest-bound exit and northeast-bound entrance
Hampshire	Chilworth–Southampton boundary			14	No access	M27 east – Southampton Airport, Portsmouth	Southwest-bound exit and northeast-bound entrance
Hampshire	Chilworth				A33 – Southampton		Southwestern terminus
Notes: Distances in kilometres and carriageway identifiers are obtained from driver location signs/location marker posts. Where a junction spans several hundred metres and the data is available, both the start and finish values for the junction are shown.
1.000 mi = 1.609 km; 1.000 km = 0.621 mi Incomplete access

== See also ==
- List of motorways in the United Kingdom

== Notes and references ==
Notes
