= Burlodge =

Food delivery company

Burlodge is an international company that supplies specialized food delivery systems for healthcare, correctional facilities, schools and other markets. The company is based in Surrey, UK and has offices in Canada, US, France and Italy. Burlodge is a member of the Ali Group. The company was founded in 1984 by Bruno Speranza.

Burlodge USA Inc. has contracts with the Federal Government.
