= Surrey =

County of England

- Non-metropolitan and ceremonial county
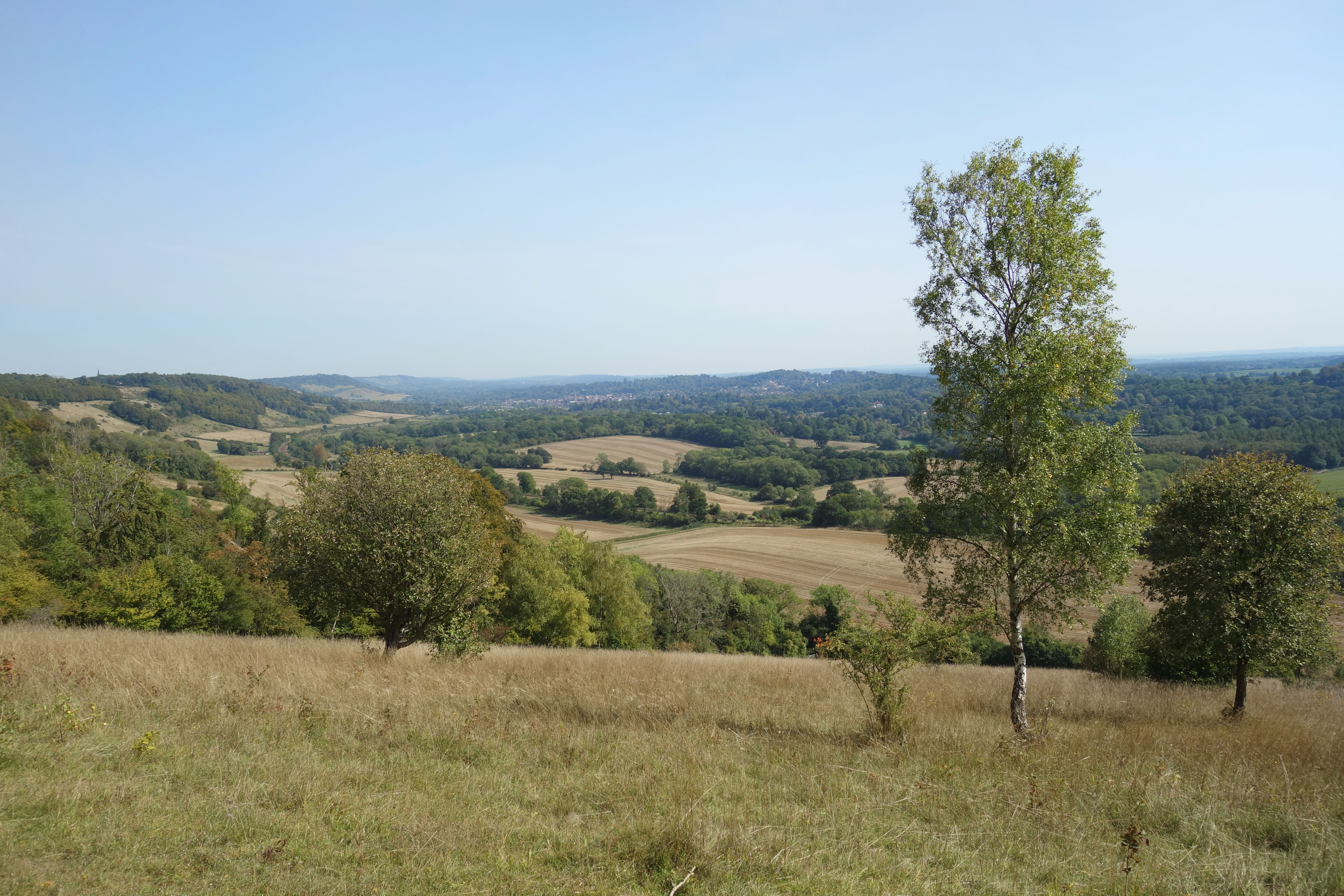
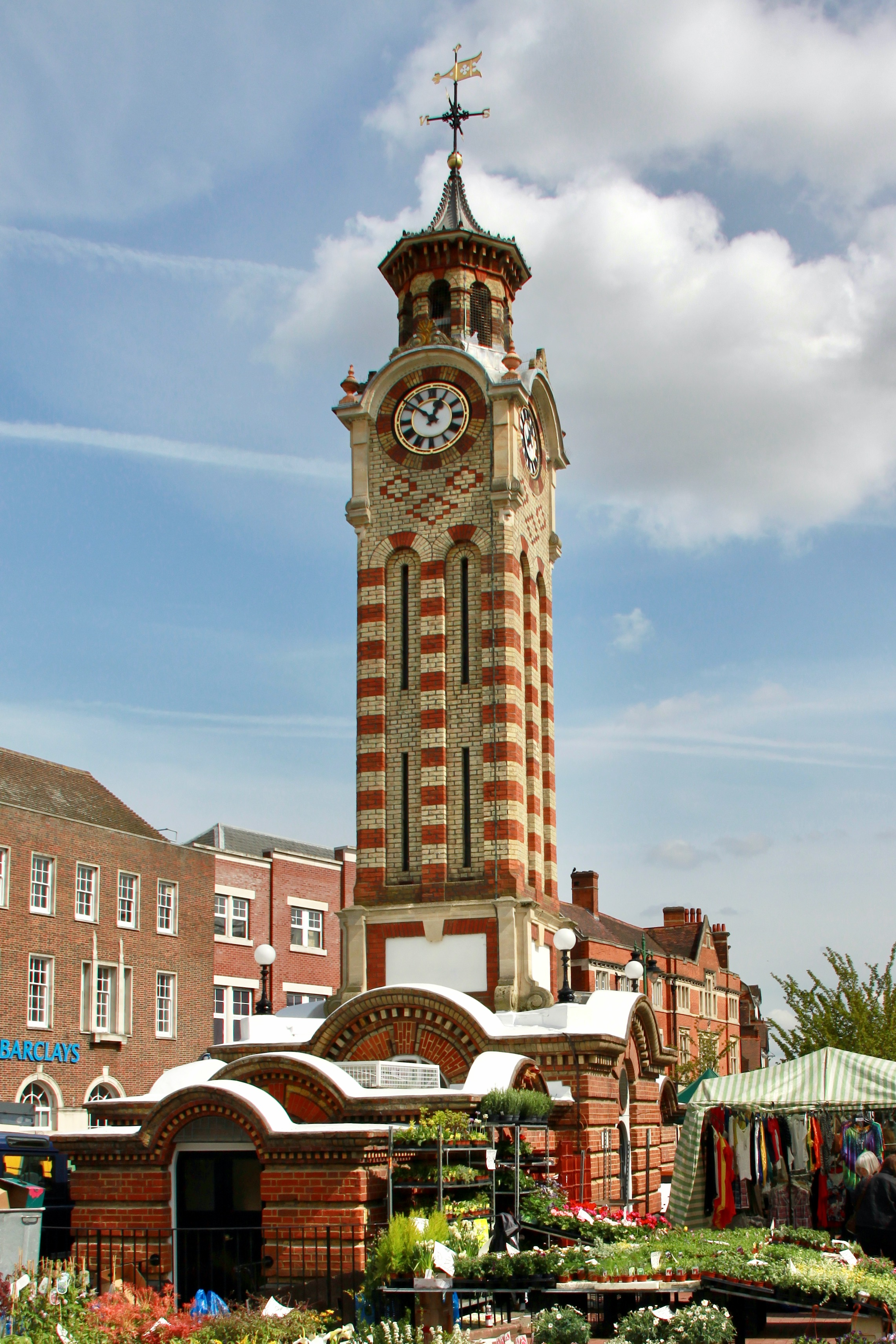
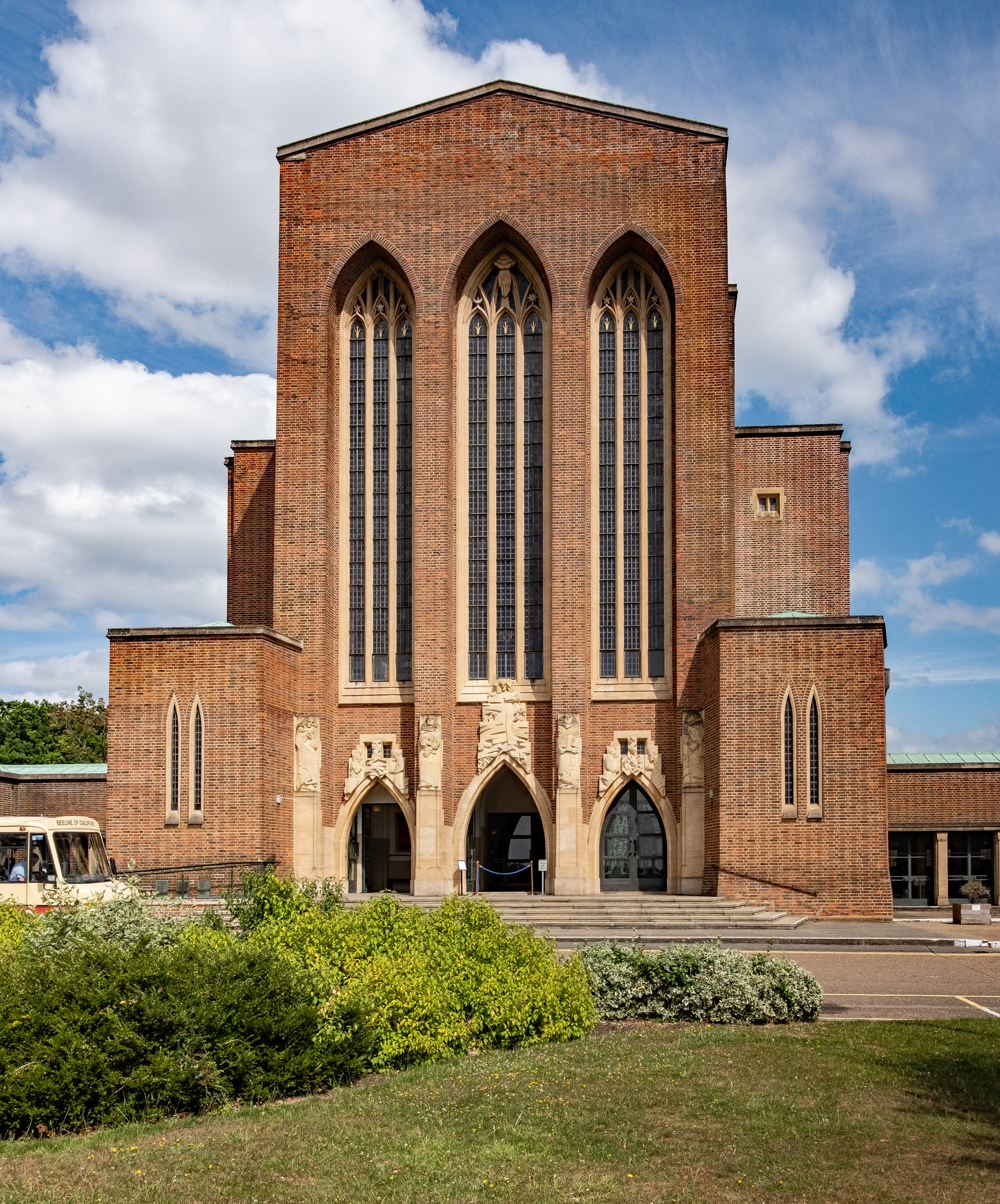
- Clockwise from top: the North Downs from Wotton, Guildford Cathedral, and the clock tower in Epsom

- Ceremonial Surrey within England Historic Surrey in the British Isles
- Coordinates: 51.25°N 0.45°W
- Sovereign state: United Kingdom
- Constituent country: England
- Region: South East
- Established: before 1066
- Time zone: UTC+0 (GMT)
  - Summer (DST): UTC+1 (BST)
- UK Parliament: List of MPs
- Police: Surrey Police
- Largest town: Woking
- Ceremonial county
- Lord Lieutenant: Michael More-Molyneux
- High Sheriff: Johanna Maria Hamilton
- Area: 1,663 km^{2} (642 sq mi)
  - Rank: 35th of 48
- Population (2024): 1,248,649
  - Rank: 12th of 48
  - Density: 751/km^{2} (1,950/sq mi)
- Non-metropolitan county
- County council: Surrey County Council
- Control: No overall control
- Admin HQ: Woodhatch Place, Reigate
- Area: 1,663 km^{2} (642 sq mi)
  - Rank: 20th of 21
- Population (2025): 1,255,255
  - Rank: 5th of 21
  - Density: 755/km^{2} (1,960/sq mi)
- ISO 3166-2: GB-SRY
- GSS code: E10000030
- ITL: UKJ23
- Website: surreycc.gov.uk
- Districts
- Districts of Surrey
- Districts: List: Spelthorne; Runnymede; Surrey Heath; Woking; Elmbridge; Guildford; Waverley; Mole Valley; Epsom and Ewell; Reigate and Banstead; Tandridge; Post-2027: West Surrey; East Surrey

Surrey (/ˈsʌri/ SUH-ree) is a ceremonial county in South East England. It is bordered by Greater London to the northeast, Kent to the east, East and West Sussex to the south, and Hampshire and Berkshire to the west. The largest settlement is Woking.

The county has an area of 1,663 km^{2} (642 square miles) and had an estimated population of 1,248,649 in 2024. The north of the county, which includes the towns of Staines-upon-Thames and Epsom, is densely populated and forms part of the Greater London conurbation. A second conurbation along the western border of the county includes Camberley and Farnham and extends into Hampshire and Berkshire. Woking is located in the north-west, and Guildford in the centre-west. The south of the county is rural, and its largest settlements are Horley in the south-east and Godalming in the south-west. For local government purposes Surrey is a non-metropolitan county with eleven districts. The county historically included much of south-west Greater London but did not include what is now the borough of Spelthorne, which was part of Middlesex. It is one of the home counties.

The defining geographical feature of the county is the North Downs, a chalk escarpment which runs from the south-west to north-east and divides the densely populated north from the more rural south; it is pierced by the rivers Wey and Mole, both tributaries of the Thames. The north of the county is a lowland, part of the Thames basin. The south-east is part of the Weald, and the south-west contains the Surrey Hills and Thursley, Hankley and Frensham Commons, an extensive area of heath. The county has the densest woodland cover in England, at 22.4 per cent.

== Geography ==
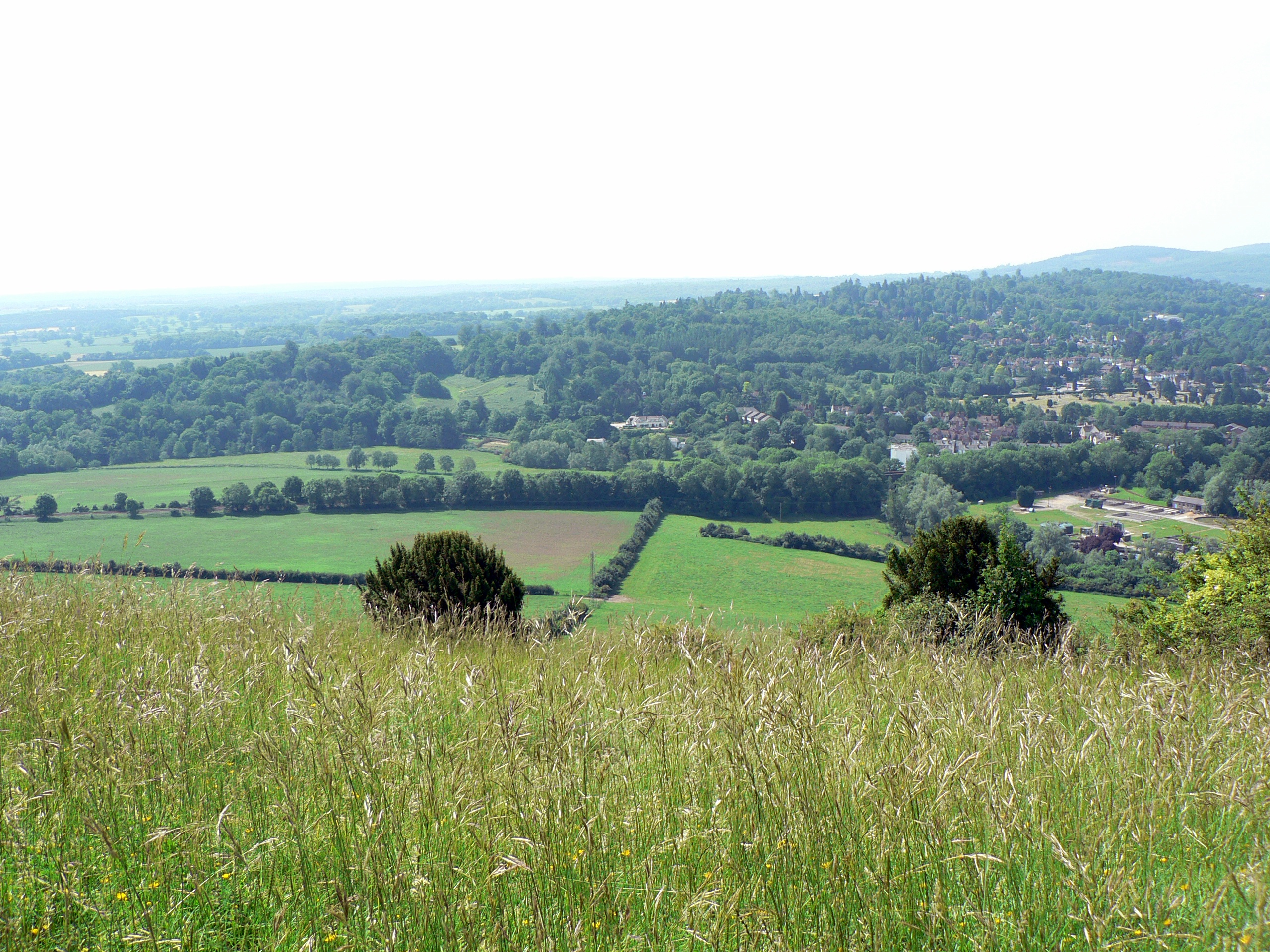
View from Box Hill

Surrey is divided in two by the chalk ridge of the North Downs, running east–west. The ridge is pierced by the rivers Wey and Mole, tributaries of the Thames, which formed the northern border of the county before modern redrawing of county boundaries, which has left part of its north bank within the county. To the north of the Downs the land is mostly flat, forming part of the basin of the Thames. The geology of this area is dominated by London Clay in the east, Bagshot Sands in the west and alluvial deposits along the rivers.

To the south of the Downs in the western part of the county are the sandstone Surrey Hills, while further east is the plain of the Low Weald, rising in the extreme southeast to the edge of the hills of the High Weald. The Downs and the area to the south form part of a concentric pattern of geological deposits which also extends across southern Kent and most of Sussex, predominantly composed of Wealden Clay, Lower Greensand and the chalk of the Downs.

Much of Surrey is in the Metropolitan Green Belt. It contains valued reserves of mature woodland (reflected in the official logo of Surrey County Council, a pair of interlocking oak leaves). Among its many notable beauty spots are Box Hill, Leith Hill, Frensham Ponds, Newlands Corner and Puttenham & Crooksbury Commons.

Surrey is the most wooded county in England, with 22.4% coverage compared to a national average of 11.8% and as such is one of the few counties not to recommend new woodlands in the subordinate planning authorities' plans. In 2020 the Surrey Heath district had the highest proportion of tree cover in England at 41%. Surrey also contains England's principal concentration of lowland heath, on sandy soils in the west of the county.

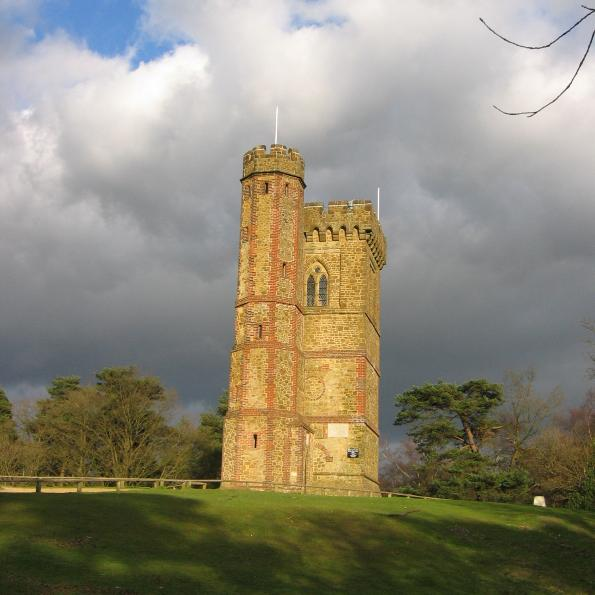
Leith Hill Tower

Agriculture not being intensive, there are many commons and access lands, together with an extensive network of footpaths and bridleways including the North Downs Way, a scenic long-distance path. Accordingly, Surrey provides many rural and semi-rural leisure activities, with a large horse population in modern terms.

The highest elevation in Surrey is Leith Hill near Dorking. It is 295 m (968 ft) above sea level and is the second highest point in southeastern England after Walbury Hill in West Berkshire which is 297 m (974 ft).

=== Surrey rivers ===
The longest river to enter Surrey is the Thames, which historically formed the boundary between the county and Middlesex. As a result of the 1965 boundary changes, many of the Surrey boroughs on the south bank of the river were transferred to Greater London, shortening the length associated with the county. The Thames now forms the Surrey–Berkshire border between Runnymede and Staines-upon-Thames, before flowing wholly within Surrey to Sunbury, from which point it marks the Surrey–Greater London border as far as Surbiton.

The River Wey is the longest tributary of the Thames above London. Other tributaries of the Thames with their courses partially in Surrey include the Mole, the Addlestone branch and Chertsey branch of the River Bourne (which merge shortly before joining the Thames), and the Hogsmill River, which drains Epsom and Ewell.

The upper reaches of the River Eden, a tributary of the Medway, are in Tandridge District, in east Surrey.

The River Colne and its anabranch, the Wraysbury River, make a brief appearance in the north of the county to join the Thames at Staines.

=== Climate ===
Like the rest of the British Isles, Surrey has a maritime climate with warm summers and cool winters. The Met Office weather station at Wisley, about 6.5 miles (10.5 km) to the north-east of Guildford, has recorded temperatures between 37.8 °C (100.0 °F) (August 2003) and −15.1 °C (4.8 °F) (January 1982). From 2006 until 2015, the Wisley weather station held the UK July record high of 36.5 °C (97.7 °F).

Climate data for Wisley, Guildford (1981–2010)
Month	Jan	Feb	Mar	Apr	May	Jun	Jul	Aug	Sep	Oct	Nov	Dec	Year
Mean daily maximum °C (°F)	7.9 (46.2)	8.3 (46.9)	11.2 (52.2)	14.1 (57.4)	17.7 (63.9)	20.6 (69.1)	23.0 (73.4)	22.7 (72.9)	19.5 (67.1)	15.4 (59.7)	11.0 (51.8)	8.2 (46.8)	15.0 (59.0)
Mean daily minimum °C (°F)	2.1 (35.8)	1.7 (35.1)	3.4 (38.1)	4.4 (39.9)	7.3 (45.1)	10.1 (50.2)	12.4 (54.3)	12.1 (53.8)	9.8 (49.6)	7.4 (45.3)	4.2 (39.6)	2.3 (36.1)	6.4 (43.6)
Average precipitation mm (inches)	61.8 (2.43)	45.4 (1.79)	44.1 (1.74)	47.1 (1.85)	51.3 (2.02)	44.4 (1.75)	46.3 (1.82)	52.8 (2.08)	54.4 (2.14)	77.8 (3.06)	67.9 (2.67)	64.4 (2.54)	657.7 (25.89)
Average rainy days	11.4	8.9	9.3	9.3	9.2	8	7.1	7.7	8.6	11.1	10.8	10.9	112.3
Mean monthly sunshine hours	54.8	75.2	110.9	161.9	192.6	195.4	206.3	200.4	144.1	113.6	65.1	44	1,564.3
Source: Met Office

== Settlements ==
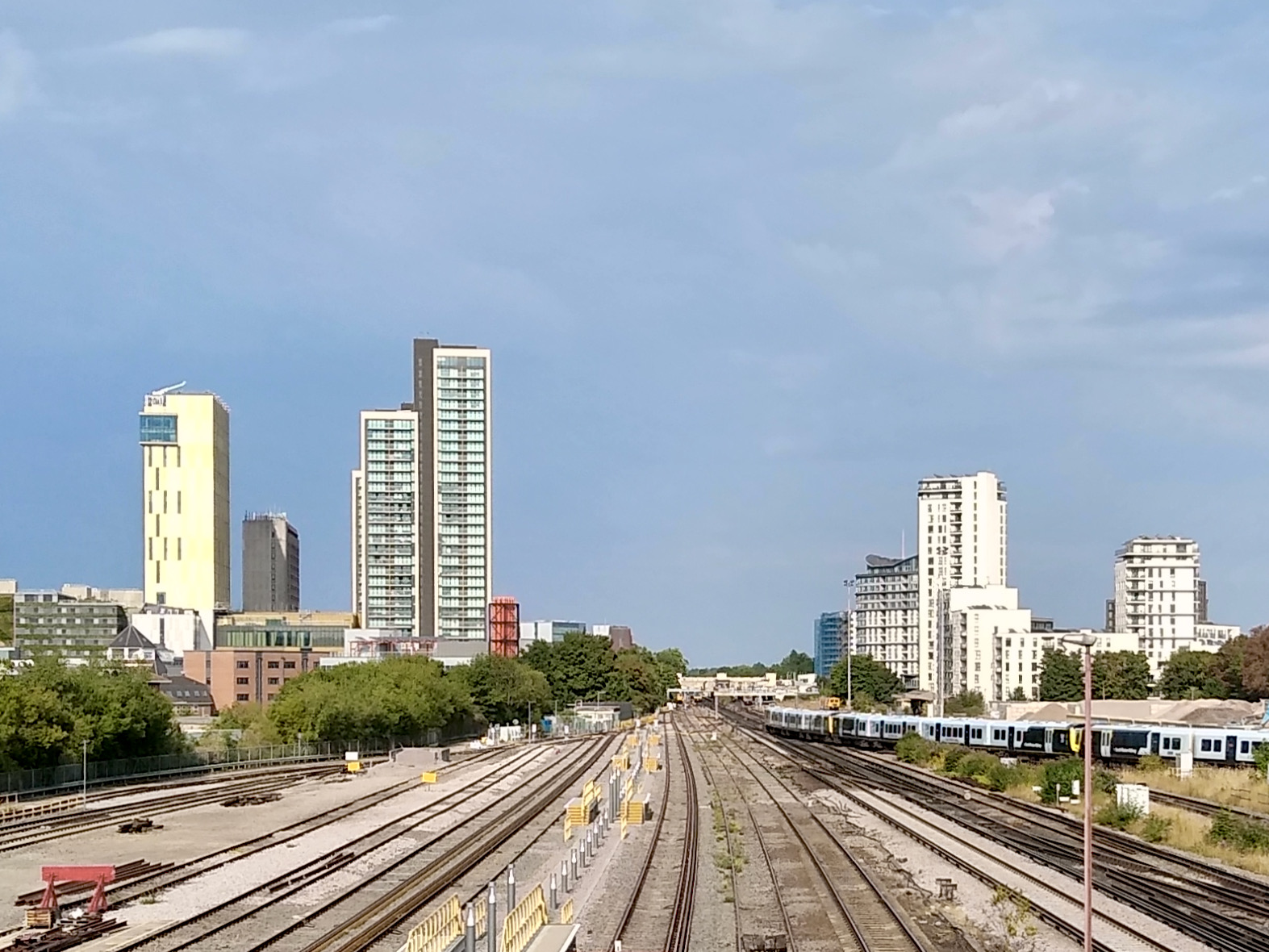
The skyline of Woking, the most populous settlement in Surrey, as seen from the western approach by railway

Surrey has a population of approximately 1.1 million people. Its largest town is Woking with a population of 105,367, followed by Guildford with 77,057, and Walton-on-Thames with 66,566. Towns of between 30,000 and 50,000 inhabitants include Ewell, and Camberley.

Much of the north of the county, extending to Guildford, is within the Greater London Built-up Area. This is an area of continuous urban sprawl linked without significant interruption of rural area to Greater London. In the west, there is a developing conurbation straddling the Hampshire/Surrey border, including the Surrey towns of Camberley and Farnham, and the Hampshire towns of Aldershot and Farnborough.

Guildford is often regarded as the historic county town, although the county administration was moved to Newington in 1791 and to Kingston upon Thames in 1893. The county council's headquarters were outside the county's boundaries from 1 April 1965, when Kingston and other areas were included within Greater London by the London Government Act 1963, until the administration moved to Reigate at the start of 2021.

== History ==
=== Ancient British and Roman periods ===
The Roman Stane or Stone Street runs through Surrey

Before Roman times the area today known as Surrey was probably largely occupied by the Atrebates tribe, centred at Calleva Atrebatum (Silchester), in the modern county of Hampshire, but eastern parts of it may have been held by the Cantiaci, based largely in Kent. The Atrebates are known to have controlled the southern bank of the Thames from Roman texts describing the tribal relations between them and the powerful Catuvellauni on the north bank.

In about AD 42 King Cunobelinus (in Welsh legend Cynfelin ap Tegfan) of the Catuvellauni died and war broke out between his sons and King Verica of the Atrebates. The Atrebates were defeated, their capital captured and their lands made subject to Togodumnus, king of the Catuvellauni, ruling from Camulodunum (Colchester). Verica fled to Gaul and appealed for Roman aid. The Atrebates were allied with Rome during the invasion of Britain in AD 43.

During the Roman era, the only important settlement within the historic area of Surrey was the London suburb of Southwark (now part of Greater London), but there were small towns at Staines, Ewell, Dorking, Croydon and Kingston upon Thames.Remains of Roman rural temples have been excavated on Farley Heath and near Wanborough and Titsey, and possible temple sites at Chiddingfold, Betchworth and Godstone. The site of a Roman villa was discovered in 1892 on Broad Street Common by a local farmer; subsequent excavations discovered traces of a second villa nearby. The area was traversed by Stane Street and other Roman roads.

=== Formation of Surrey ===
During the 5th and 6th centuries Surrey was conquered and settled by Saxons. The names of possible tribes inhabiting the area have been conjectured on the basis of place names. These include the Godhelmingas (around Godalming) and Woccingas (between Woking and Wokingham in Berkshire). It has also been speculated that the entries for the Nox gaga and Oht gaga peoples in the Tribal Hidage may refer to two groups living in the vicinity of Surrey. Together their lands were assessed at a total of 7,000 hides, equal to the assessment for Sussex or Essex.

Surrey may have formed part of a larger Middle Saxon kingdom or confederacy, also including areas north of the Thames. The name Surrey is derived from Sūþrīge (or Suthrige), meaning "southern region" (while Bede refers to it as Sudergeona) and this may originate in its status as the southern portion of the Middle Saxon territory.

If it ever existed, the Middle Saxon kingdom had disappeared by the 7th century, and Surrey became a frontier area disputed between the kingdoms of Kent, Essex, Sussex, Wessex and Mercia, until its permanent absorption by Wessex in 825. Despite this fluctuating situation it retained its identity as an enduring territorial unit. During the 7th century Surrey became Christian and initially formed part of the East Saxon diocese of London, indicating that it was under East Saxon rule at that time, but was later transferred to the West Saxon diocese of Winchester. Its most important religious institution throughout the Anglo-Saxon period and beyond was Chertsey Abbey, founded in 666. At this point Surrey was evidently under Kentish domination, as the abbey was founded under the patronage of King Ecgberht of Kent. However, a few years later at least part of it was subject to Mercia, since in 673–675 further lands were given to Chertsey Abbey by Frithuwald, a local sub-king (subregulus) ruling under the sovereignty of Wulfhere of Mercia. A decade later Surrey passed into the hands of King Caedwalla of Wessex, who also conquered Kent and Sussex, and founded a monastery at Farnham in 686.

The region remained under the control of Caedwalla's successor Ine in the early 8th century. Its political history for most of the 8th century is unclear, although West Saxon control may have broken down around 722, but by 784–785 it had passed into the hands of King Offa of Mercia. Mercian rule continued until 825, when following his victory over the Mercians at the Battle of Ellandun, King Egbert of Wessex seized control of Surrey, along with Sussex, Kent and Essex. It was incorporated into Wessex as a shire and continued thereafter under the rule of the West Saxon kings, who eventually became kings of all of England.

==== Identified sub-kings of Surrey ====
- Frithuwald (c. 673–675)
- Frithuric? (c. 675 – c. 686)

=== West Saxon and English shire ===
A map showing the traditional boundaries of Surrey (c. 800–1899) and its constituent hundreds

In the 9th century England was afflicted, along with the rest of northwestern Europe, by the attacks of Scandinavian Vikings. Surrey's inland position shielded it from coastal raiding, so that it was not normally troubled except by the largest and most ambitious Scandinavian armies.

In 851 an exceptionally large invasion force of Danes arrived at the mouth of the Thames in a fleet of about 350 ships, which would have carried over 15,000 men. Having sacked Canterbury and London and defeated King Beorhtwulf of Mercia in battle, the Danes crossed the Thames into Surrey, but were slaughtered by a West Saxon army led by King Æthelwulf in the Battle of Aclea, bringing the invasion to an end.

Two years later the men of Surrey marched into Kent to help their Kentish neighbours fight a raiding force at Thanet, but suffered heavy losses including their ealdorman, Huda. In 892 Surrey was the scene of another major battle when a large Danish army, variously reported at 200, 250 and 350 ship-loads, moved west from its encampment in Kent and raided in Hampshire and Berkshire. Withdrawing with their loot, the Danes were intercepted and defeated at Farnham by an army led by Alfred the Great's son Edward, the future King Edward the Elder, and fled across the Thames towards Essex.

Surrey remained safe from attack for over a century thereafter, due to its location and to the growing power of the West Saxon, later English, kingdom. Kingston was the scene for the coronations of Æthelstan in 924 and of Æthelred the Unready in 978, and, according to later tradition, also of other 10th-century Kings of England. The renewed Danish attacks during the disastrous reign of Æthelred led to the devastation of Surrey by the army of Thorkell the Tall, which ravaged all of southeastern England in 1009–1011. The climax of this wave of attacks came in 1016, which saw prolonged fighting between the forces of King Edmund Ironside and the Danish king Cnut, including an English victory over the Danes somewhere in northeastern Surrey, but ended with the conquest of England by Cnut.

Cnut's death in 1035 was followed by a period of political uncertainty, as the succession was disputed between his sons. In 1036 Alfred, son of King Æthelred, returned from Normandy, where he had been taken for safety as a child at the time of Cnut's conquest of England. It is uncertain what his intentions were, but after landing with a small retinue in Sussex he was met by Godwin, Earl of Wessex, who escorted him in apparently friendly fashion to Guildford. Having taken lodgings there, Alfred's men were attacked as they slept and killed, mutilated or enslaved by Godwin's followers, while the prince himself was blinded and imprisoned, dying shortly afterwards. This must have contributed to the antipathy between Godwin and Alfred's brother Edward the Confessor, who came to the throne in 1042.

This hostility peaked in 1051, when Godwin and his sons were driven into exile; returning the following year, the men of Surrey rose to support them, along with those of Sussex, Kent, Essex and elsewhere, helping them secure their reinstatement and the banishment of the king's Norman entourage. The repercussions of this antagonism helped bring about the Norman Conquest of England in 1066.

The Domesday Book records that the largest landowners in Surrey (then Sudrie) at the end of Edward's reign were Chertsey Abbey and Harold Godwinson, Earl of Wessex and later king, followed by the estates of King Edward himself. Apart from the abbey, most of whose lands were within the shire, Surrey was not the principal focus of any major landowner's holdings, a tendency which was to persist in later periods. (Note: Domesday Book valued the Surrey estates of Chertsey Abbey in 1066 at £189 a year, the abbey's only other holdings being £11 worth in Berkshire. Harold's lands in Surrey were valued at £175 a year, while another £15 worth were still entered under the name of his late father Earl Godwin. The revenues of King Edward's Surrey estates totalled £117, Queen Edith's £76, the Archbishopric of Canterbury's £66 and the Bishopric of Winchester's £55, all fractions of vast national holdings. The earl with jurisdiction over Surrey, Harold's brother Leofwine, held only £17 there, from a national total of £290, whose greatest concentrations were in Kent and Sussex, while his mother, Godwin's widow Gytha, held £16 from a total of £590, chiefly clustered in Devon, Wiltshire and Sussex. The other great landowners with Surrey estates were the thegns Ætsere, Ægelnoð and Osward. Ætsere held £61 in Surrey, from a total of £271 including £163 in Sussex, Ægelnoð held £40, from a total of £260 including £71 in Kent, £58 in Sussex and £50 in Oxfordshire, and Osward held £26, from a total of £109 including £65 in Kent, where he was also sheriff. Donald Henson, The English Elite in 1066: Gone but not forgotten (Hockwold-cum-Wilton 2001), pp. 20–23, 26–27, 32–34, 39, 49–50, 64–65, 70, 73, 85, 179–181.) Given the vast and widespread landed interests and the national and international preoccupations of the monarchy and the earldom of Wessex, the Abbot of Chertsey was therefore probably the most important figure in the local elite.

The Anglo-Saxon period saw the emergence of the shire's internal division into 14 hundreds, which continued until Victorian times. These were the hundreds of Blackheath, Brixton, Copthorne, Effingham Half-Hundred, Elmbridge, Farnham, Godalming, Godley, Kingston, Reigate, Tandridge, Wallington, Woking and Wotton.

==== Identified ealdormen of Surrey ====
- Wulfheard (c. 823)
- Huda (?–853)
- Æðelweard (late 10th century)
- Æðelmær (?–1016)

=== Later Medieval Surrey ===
After the Battle of Hastings, the Norman army advanced through Kent into Surrey, where they defeated an English force which attacked them at Southwark and then burned that suburb. Rather than try to attack London across the river, the Normans continued west through Surrey, crossed the Thames at Wallingford in Berkshire and descended on London from the north-west. As was the case across England, the native ruling class of Surrey was virtually eliminated by Norman seizure of land. Only one significant English landowner, the brother of the last English Abbot of Chertsey, remained by the time the Domesday survey was conducted in 1086. (Note: This was Oswald, whose brother Wulfwold, Abbot of Chertsey and Bath, died in 1084. Oswald was one of the small number of English landowners who managed to increase their holdings in the wake of the conquest: his estates, centred on Effingham, were valued at £18 a year in 1066, but the acquisition of additional manors raised this to £35 by 1086. His descendants, the de La Leigh family, relinquished the majority of their Surrey lands in the 12th century, but remained landowners in the county until the early 14th century. One of them, William de La Leigh, served as Sheriff of Surrey in 1267.) At that time the largest landholding in Surrey, as in many other parts of the country, was the expanded royal estate, while the next largest holding belonged to Richard fitz Gilbert, founder of the de Clare family.

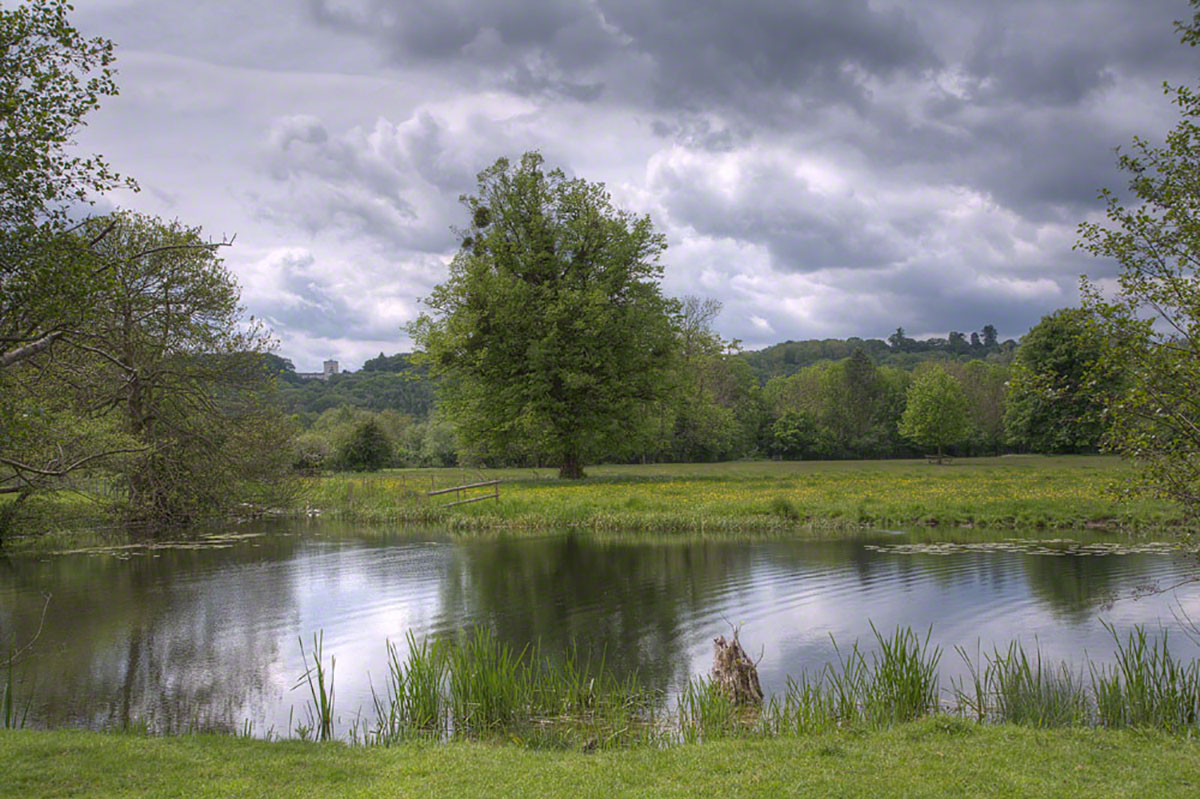
Runnymede, where Magna Carta was sealed

In 1088, King William II granted William de Warenne the title of Earl of Surrey as a reward for Warenne's loyalty during the rebellion that followed the death of William I. When the male line of the Warennes became extinct in the 14th century, the earldom was inherited by the Fitzalan Earls of Arundel. The Fitzalan line of Earls of Surrey died out in 1415, but after other short-lived revivals in the 15th century the title was conferred in 1483 on the Howard family, who still hold it. However, Surrey was not a major focus of any of these families' interests.

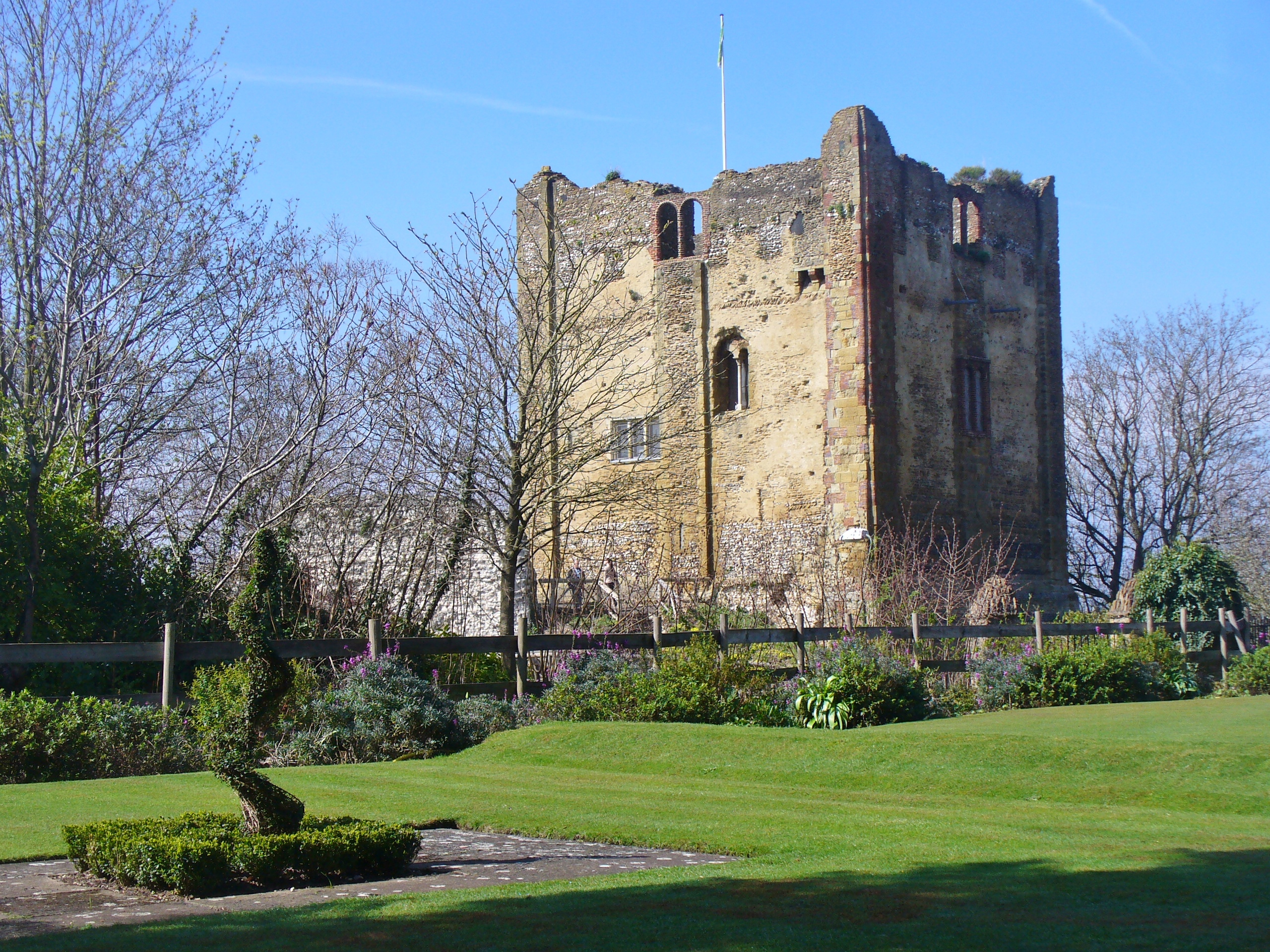

|Guildford Castle

Guildford Castle, one of many fortresses originally established by the Normans to help them subdue the country, was rebuilt in stone and developed as a royal palace in the 12th century. (Note: Besides the castles built or rebuilt in stone, remains of Norman castles of earth and timber have been identified at Abinger, Cranleigh, Thunderfield, and Walton-on-the-Hill.) Farnham Castle was built during the 12th century as a residence for the Bishop of Winchester, while other stone castles were constructed in the same period at Bletchingley by the de Clares and at Reigate by the Warennes.

During King John's struggle with the barons, Magna Carta was issued in June 1215 at Runnymede near Egham. John's efforts to reverse this concession reignited the war, and in 1216 the barons invited Prince Louis of France to take the throne. Having landed in Kent and been welcomed in London, he advanced across Surrey to attack John, then at Winchester, occupying Reigate and Guildford castles along the way.

Guildford Castle later became one of the favourite residences of King Henry III, who considerably expanded the palace there. During the baronial revolt against Henry, in 1264 the rebel army of Simon de Montfort passed southwards through Surrey on their way to the Battle of Lewes in Sussex. Although the rebels were victorious, soon after the battle royal forces captured and destroyed Bletchingley Castle, whose owner Gilbert de Clare, Earl of Hertford and Gloucester, was de Montfort's most powerful ally.

By the 14th century, castles were of dwindling military importance, but remained a mark of social prestige, leading to the construction of castles at Starborough near Lingfield by Lord Cobham, and at Betchworth by John Fitzalan, whose father had recently inherited the Earldom of Surrey. Though Reigate and Bletchingley remained modest settlements, the role of their castles as local centres for the two leading aristocratic interests in Surrey had enabled them to gain borough status by the early 13th century. As a result, they gained representation in Parliament when it became established towards the end of that century, alongside the more substantial urban settlements of Guildford and Southwark. Surrey's third sizeable town, Kingston, despite its size, borough status and historical association with the monarchy, did not gain parliamentary representation until 1832.

Surrey had little political or economic significance in the Middle Ages. Its agricultural wealth was limited by the infertility of most of its soils, and it was not the main power-base of any important aristocratic family, nor the seat of a bishopric. The London suburb of Southwark was a major urban settlement, and the proximity of the capital boosted the wealth and population of the surrounding area, but urban development elsewhere was sapped by the overshadowing predominance of London and by the lack of direct access to the sea. Population pressure in the 12th and 13th centuries initiated the gradual clearing of the Weald, the forest spanning the borders of Surrey, Sussex and Kent, which had hitherto been left undeveloped due to the difficulty of farming on its heavy clay soil.

Surrey's most significant source of prosperity in the later Middle Ages was the production of woollen cloth, which emerged during that period as England's main export industry. The county was an early centre of English textile manufacturing, benefiting from the presence of deposits of fuller's earth, the rare mineral composite important in the process of finishing cloth, around Reigate and Nutfield. The industry in Surrey was focused on Guildford, which gave its name to a variety of cloth, gilforte, which was exported widely across Europe and the Middle East and imitated by manufacturers elsewhere in Europe. However, as the English cloth industry expanded, Surrey was outstripped by other growing regions of production.

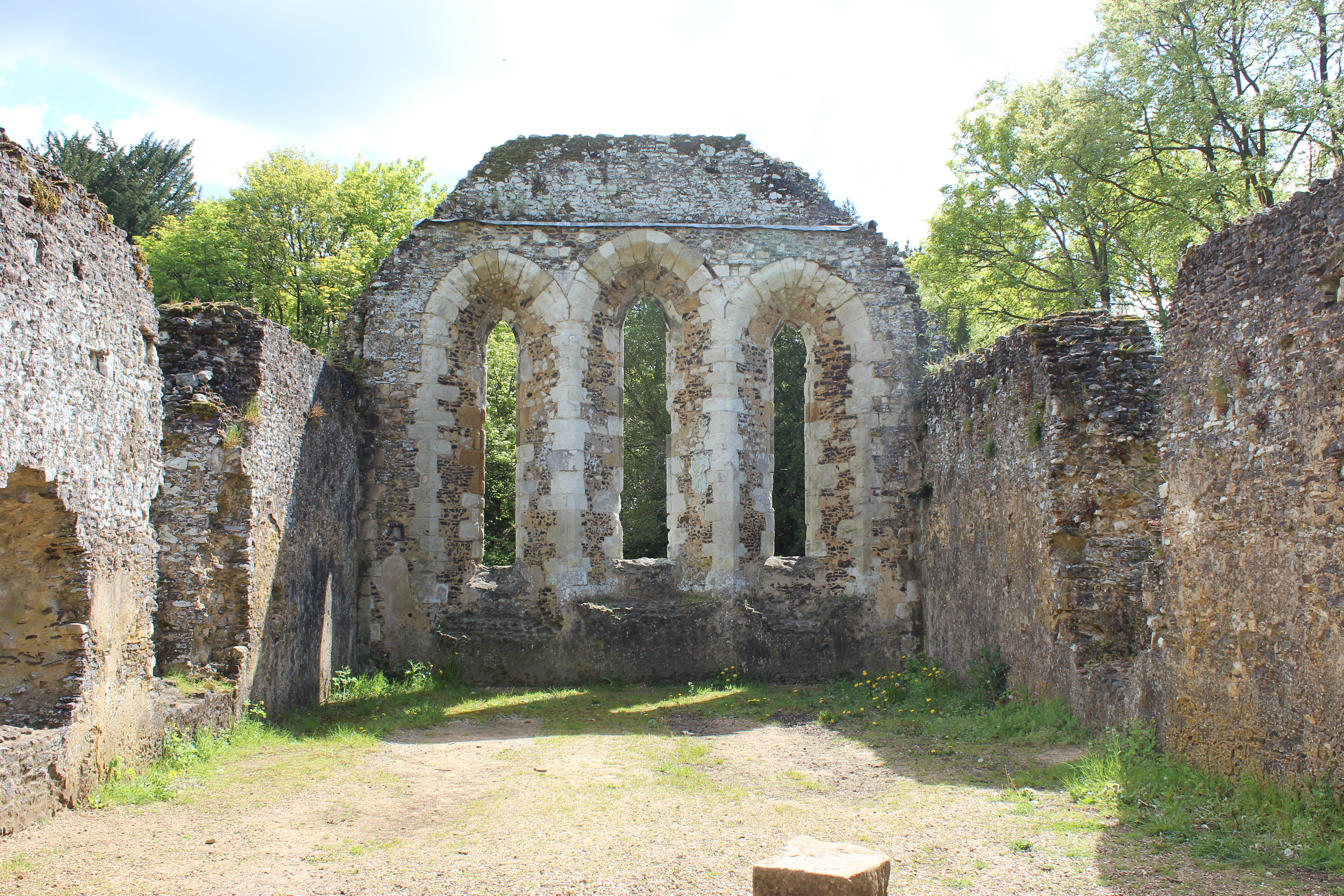
Ruins of the monks' dormitory at Waverley Abbey

Though Surrey was not the scene of serious fighting in the various rebellions and civil wars of the period, armies from Kent heading for London via Southwark passed through what were then the extreme north-eastern fringes of Surrey during the Peasants' Revolt of 1381 and Cade's Rebellion in 1450, and at various stages of the Wars of the Roses in 1460, 1469 and 1471. The upheaval of 1381 also involved widespread local unrest in Surrey, as was the case all across south-eastern England, and some recruits from Surrey joined the Kentish rebel army.

In 1082 a Cluniac abbey was founded at Bermondsey by Alwine, a wealthy English citizen of London. Waverley Abbey near Farnham, founded in 1128, was the first Cistercian monastery in England. Over the next quarter-century monks spread out from here to found new houses, creating a network of twelve monasteries descended from Waverley across southern and central England. The 12th and early 13th centuries also saw the establishment of Augustinian priories at Merton, Newark, Tandridge, Southwark and Reigate. A Dominican friary was established at Guildford by Henry III's widow Eleanor of Provence, in memory of her grandson who had died at Guildford in 1274. In the 15th century a Carthusian priory was founded by King Henry V at Sheen. These would all perish, along with the still important Benedictine abbey of Chertsey, in the 16th-century Dissolution of the Monasteries.

Now fallen into disuse, some English counties had nicknames for those raised there such as a 'tyke' from Yorkshire, or a 'yellowbelly' from Lincolnshire. In the case of Surrey, the term was a 'Surrey capon', from Surrey's role in the later Middle Ages as the county where chickens were fattened up for the London meat markets.

=== Early Modern Surrey ===
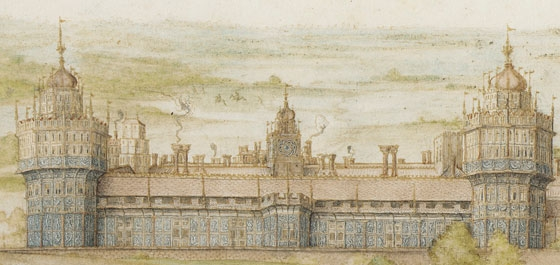
Nonsuch Palace

Under the early Tudor kings, magnificent royal palaces were constructed in northeastern Surrey, conveniently close to London. At Richmond an existing royal residence was rebuilt on a grand scale under Henry VII, who also founded a Franciscan friary nearby in 1499. The still more spectacular palace of Nonsuch was later built for Henry VIII near Ewell. The palace at Guildford Castle had fallen out of use long before, but a royal hunting lodge existed outside the town. All these have since been demolished.

During the Cornish Rebellion of 1497, the rebels heading for London briefly occupied Guildford and fought a skirmish with a government detachment on Guildown outside the town, before marching on to defeat at Blackheath in Kent. The forces of Wyatt's Rebellion in 1554 passed through what was then northeastern Surrey on their way from Kent to London, briefly occupying Southwark and then crossing the Thames at Kingston after failing to storm London Bridge.

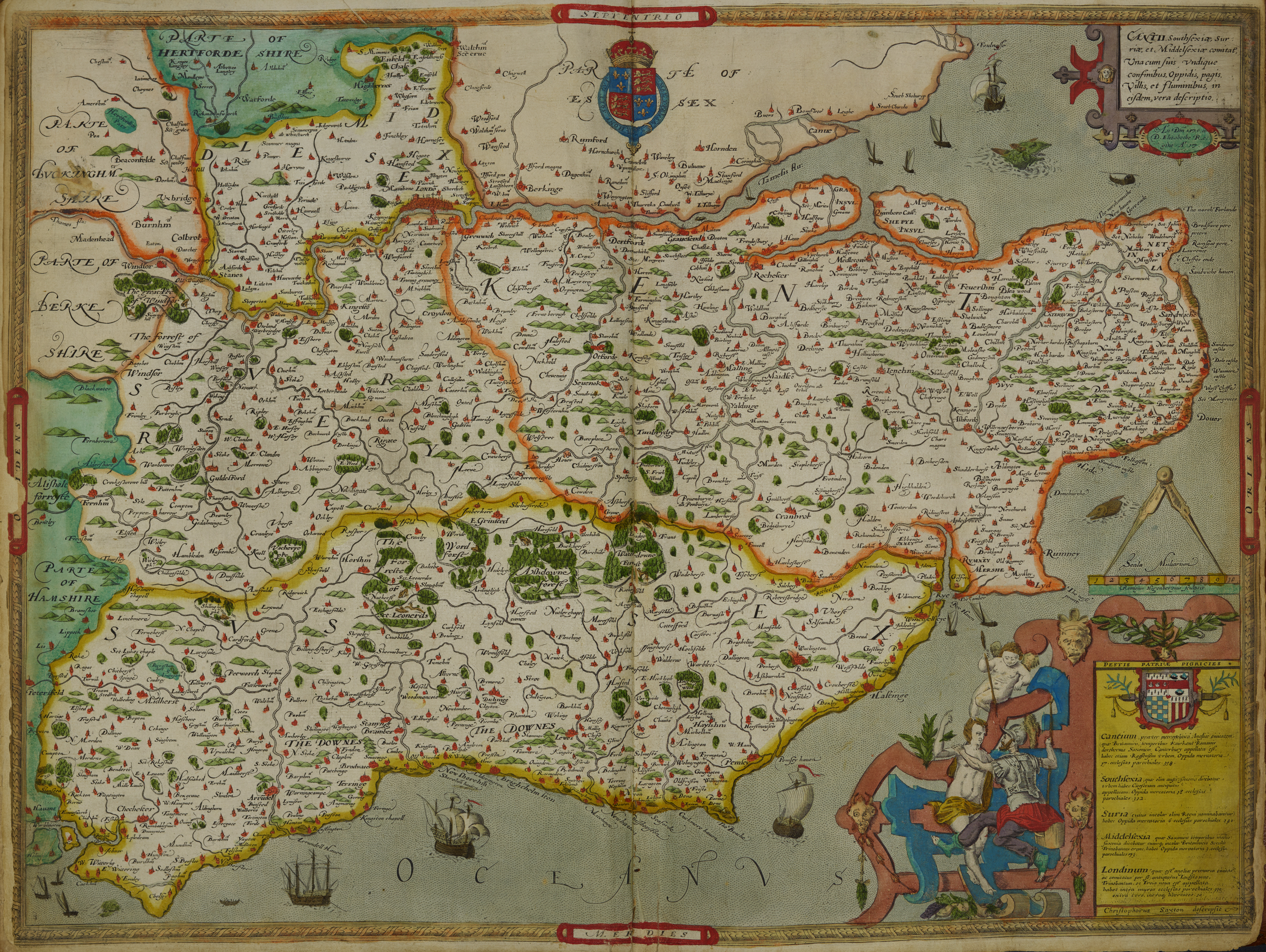
Hand-drawn map of Kent, Sussex, Surrey and Middlesex from 1575

Surrey's cloth industry declined in the 16th century and collapsed in the 17th, harmed by falling standards and competition from more effective producers in other parts of England. The iron industry in the Weald, whose rich deposits had been exploited since prehistoric times, expanded and spread from its base in Sussex into Kent and Surrey after 1550. New furnace technology stimulated further growth in the early 17th century, but this hastened the extinction of the business as the mines were worked out. However, this period also saw the emergence of important new industries, centred on the valley of the Tillingbourne, south-east of Guildford, which often adapted watermills originally built for the now moribund cloth industry. The production of brass goods and wire in this area was relatively short-lived, falling victim to competitors in the Midlands in the mid-17th century, but the manufacture of paper and gunpowder proved more enduring. For a time in the mid-17th century the Surrey mills were the main producers of gunpowder in England.

A glass industry also developed in the mid-16th century on the southwestern borders of Surrey, but had collapsed by 1630, as the wood-fired Surrey glassworks were surpassed by emerging coal-fired works elsewhere in England. The Wey Navigation, opened in 1653, was one of England's first canal systems.

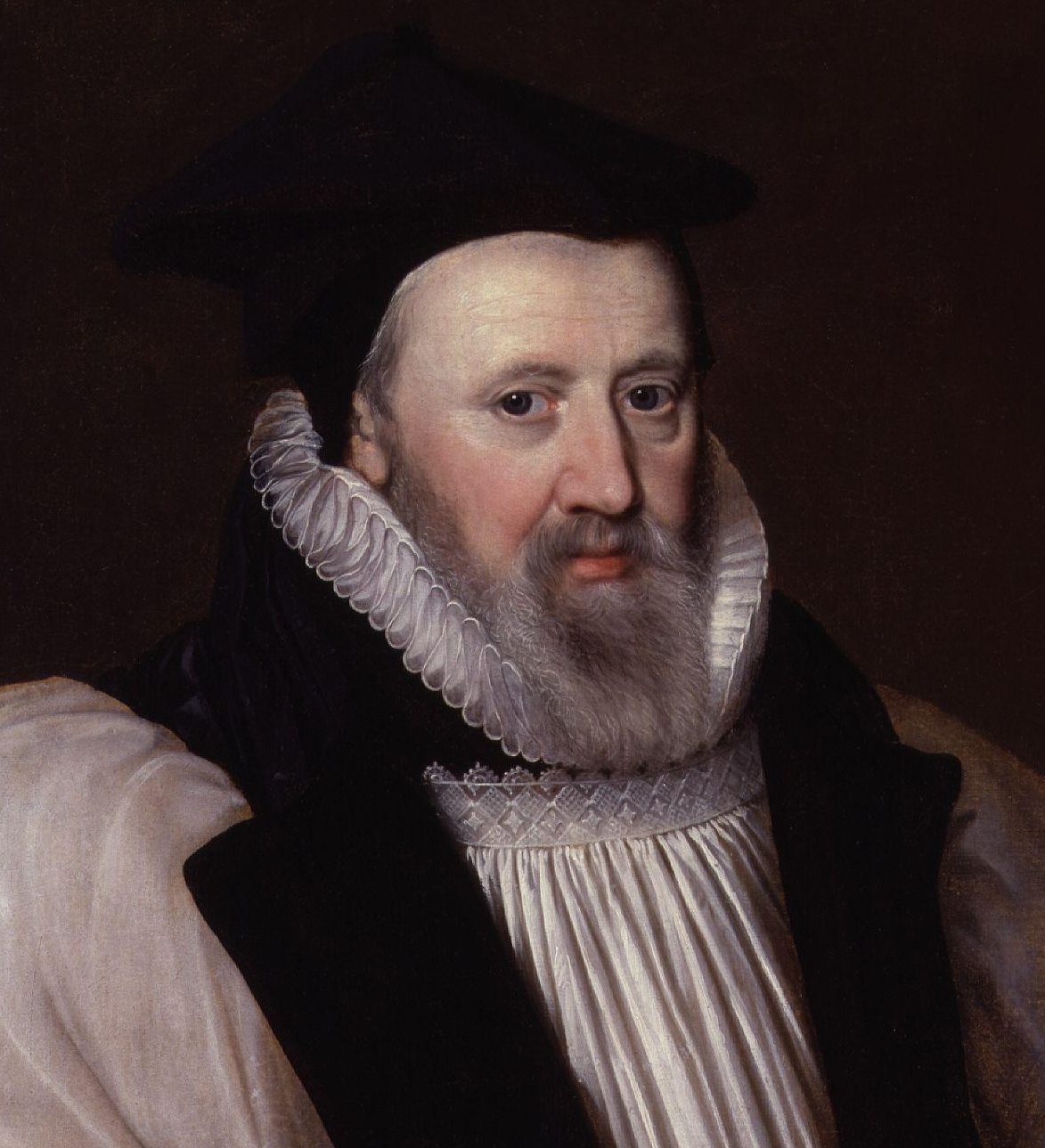
George Abbot

George Abbot, the son of a Guildford clothworker, served as Archbishop of Canterbury in 1611–1633. In 1619 he founded Abbot's Hospital, an almshouse in Guildford, which is still operating. He also made unsuccessful efforts to revitalise the local cloth industry. One of his brothers, Robert, became Bishop of Salisbury, while another, Maurice, was a founding shareholder of the East India Company who became the company's Governor and later Lord Mayor of London.

Southwark expanded rapidly in this period, and by 1600, if considered as a separate entity, it was the second-largest urban area in England, behind only London itself. Parts of it were outside the jurisdiction of the government of the City of London, and as a result the area of Bankside became London's principal entertainment district, since the social control exercised there by the local authorities of Surrey was less effective and restrictive than that of the City authorities. Bankside was the scene of the golden age of Elizabethan and Jacobean theatre, with the work of playwrights including William Shakespeare, Christopher Marlowe, Ben Jonson and John Webster performed in its playhouses. The leading actor and impresario Edward Alleyn founded the College of God's Gift in Dulwich with an endowment including an art collection, which was later expanded and opened to the public in 1817, becoming Britain's first public art gallery.

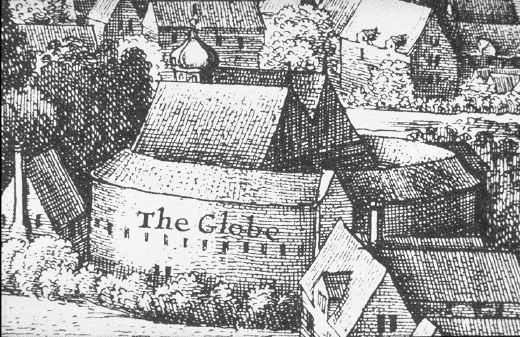
The second Globe theatre, built 1614

Surrey almost entirely escaped the direct impact of fighting during the main phase of the English Civil War in 1642–1646. The local Parliamentarian gentry led by Sir Richard Onslow were able to secure the county without difficulty on the outbreak of war. Farnham Castle was briefly occupied by the advancing Royalists in late 1642, but was easily stormed by the Parliamentarians under Sir William Waller. A new Royalist offensive in late 1643 saw skirmishing around Farnham between Waller's forces and Ralph Hopton's Royalists, but these brief incursions into the western fringes of Surrey marked the limits of Royalist advances on the county. At the end of 1643 Surrey combined with Kent, Sussex and Hampshire to form the South-Eastern Association, a military federation modelled on Parliament's existing Eastern Association.

In the uneasy peace that followed the Royalists' defeat, a political crisis in summer 1647 saw Sir Thomas Fairfax's New Model Army pass through Surrey on their way to occupy London, and subsequent billeting of troops in the county caused considerable discontent. During the brief Second Civil War of 1648, the Earl of Holland entered Surrey in July, hoping to ignite a Royalist revolt. He raised his standard at Kingston and advanced south, but found little support. After confused manoeuvres between Reigate and Dorking as Parliamentary troops closed in, his force of 500 men fled northwards and was overtaken and routed at Kingston.

Surrey had a central role in the history of the radical political movements unleashed by the civil war. In October 1647 the first manifesto of the movement that became known as the Levellers, The Case of the Armie Truly Stated, was drafted at Guildford by the elected representatives of army regiments and civilian radicals from London. This document combined specific grievances with wider demands for constitutional change on the basis of popular sovereignty. It formed the template for the more systematic and radical Agreement of the People, drafted by the same men later that month. It also led to the Putney Debates shortly afterwards, in which its signatories met with Oliver Cromwell and other senior officers in the Surrey village of Putney, where the army had established its headquarters, to argue over the future political constitution of England. In 1649 the Diggers, led by Gerrard Winstanley, established their communal settlement at St. George's Hill near Weybridge to implement egalitarian ideals of common ownership, but were eventually driven out by the local landowners through violence and litigation. A smaller Digger commune was then established near Cobham, but suffered the same fate in 1650.

=== Modern history ===
Prior to the Reform Act 1832, Surrey returned fourteen Members of Parliament (MPs), two representing the county and two each from the six boroughs of Bletchingley, Gatton, Guildford, Haslemere, Reigate and Southwark. For two centuries before the Reform Act, the dominant political network in Surrey was that of the Onslows of Clandon Park, a gentry family established in the county from the early 17th century, who were raised to the peerage in 1716. Members of the family won at least one of Surrey's two county seats in all but three of the 30 general elections between 1628 and 1768, while they took one or both of the seats for their local borough of Guildford in every election from 1660 to 1830, usually representing the Whig Party after its emergence in the late 1670s. Successive heads of the family held the post of Lord Lieutenant of Surrey continuously from 1716 to 1814.

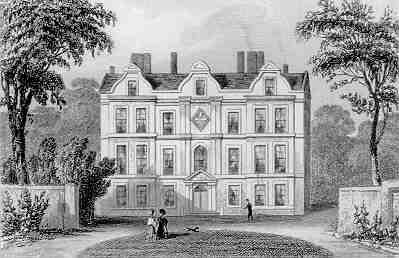
Kew Palace in 1835

One of the principal residences of the British monarchy in the 18th century was Kew Palace in north Surrey, leased by Queen Caroline of Brandenburg-Ansbach in 1728 and inhabited by her son Frederick, Prince of Wales, and later by King George III and Queen Charlotte of Mecklenburg-Strelitz. After the latter's death at the palace in 1818 it was sold. The White House was demolished about this time, but the Dutch House survives and is now a museum.

In 1765 the Richmond Theatre was built in Surrey under the supervision of David Garrick. It was modelled after the Theatre Royal, Drury Lane and served as one of Surrey's main theatre's until it was demolished in 1884.

Until the modern era Surrey, apart from its northeastern corner, was quite sparsely populated in comparison with many parts of southern England, and remained somewhat rustic despite its proximity to the capital. Communications began to improve, and the influence of London to increase, with the development of turnpike roads and a stagecoach system in the 18th century. A far more profound transformation followed with the arrival of the railways, beginning in the late 1830s. The availability of rapid transport enabled prosperous London workers to settle all across Surrey and travel daily to work in the capital. This phenomenon of commuting brought explosive growth to Surrey's population and wealth, and tied its economy and society inextricably to London.

There was rapid expansion in existing towns like Guildford, Farnham, and most spectacularly Croydon, while new towns such as Woking and Redhill emerged beside the railway lines. The huge numbers of incomers to the county and the transformation of rural, farming communities into a "commuter belt" contributed to a decline in the traditional local culture, including the gradual demise of the distinctive Surrey dialect. This may have survived among the "Surrey Men" into the late 19th century, but is now extinct.

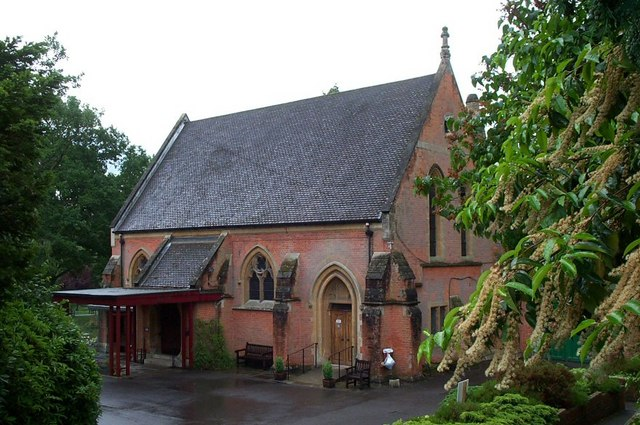
Britain's first crematorium, in the Borough of Woking

Meanwhile, London itself spread swiftly across north-eastern Surrey. In 1800 it extended only to Vauxhall; a century later the city's growth had reached as far as Putney and Streatham. This expansion was reflected in the creation of the County of London in 1889, detaching the areas subsumed by the city from Surrey. The expansion of London continued in the 20th century, engulfing Croydon, Kingston and many smaller settlements. This led to a further contraction of Surrey in 1965 with the creation of Greater London, under the London Government Act 1963; however, Staines and Sunbury-on-Thames, previously in Middlesex, were transferred to Surrey, extending the county across the Thames. Surrey's boundaries were altered again in 1974 when Gatwick Airport was transferred to West Sussex.

In 1849 Brookwood Cemetery was established near Woking to serve the population of London, connected to the capital by its own railway service. It soon developed into the largest burial ground in the world. Woking was also the site of Britain's first crematorium, which opened in 1878, and its first mosque, founded in 1889. In 1881 Godalming became the first town in the world with a public electricity supply.

The eastern part of Surrey was transferred from the Diocese of Winchester to that of Rochester in 1877. In 1905 this area was separated to form a new Diocese of Southwark. The rest of the county, together with part of eastern Hampshire, was separated from Winchester in 1927 to become the Diocese of Guildford, whose cathedral was consecrated in 1961.

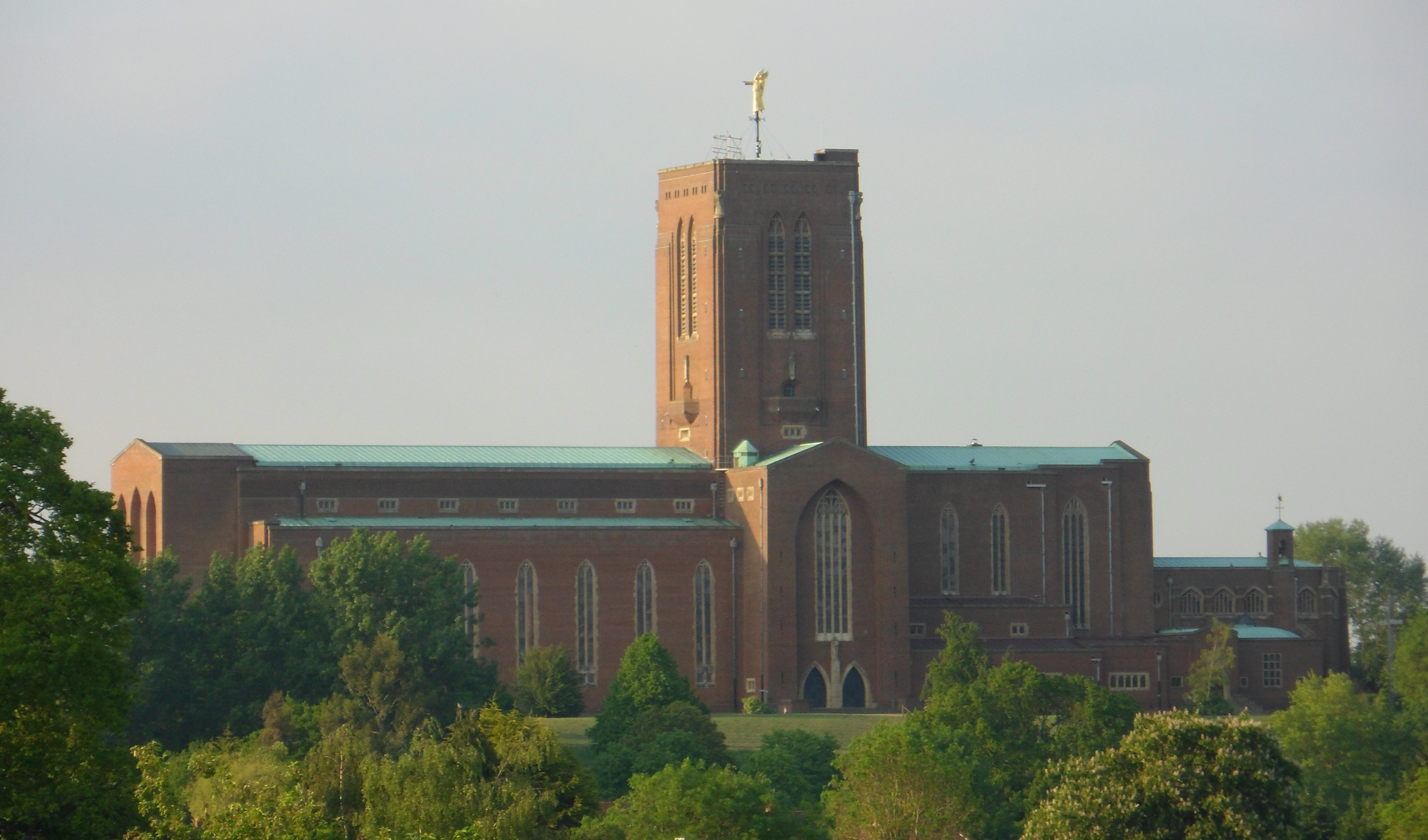
Guildford Cathedral, designed by Edward Maufe

During the later 19th century Surrey became important in the development of architecture in Britain and the wider world. Its traditional building forms made a significant contribution to the vernacular revival architecture associated with the Arts and Crafts Movement, and would exert a lasting influence. The prominence of Surrey peaked in the 1890s, when it was the focus for globally important developments in domestic architecture, in particular the early work of Edwin Lutyens, who grew up in the county and was greatly influenced by its traditional styles and materials.

The late 19th and early 20th centuries saw the demise of Surrey's long-standing industries manufacturing paper and gunpowder. Most of the county's paper mills closed in the years after 1870, and the last survivor shut in 1928. Gunpowder production fell victim to the First World War, which brought about a huge expansion of the British munitions industry, followed by sharp contraction and consolidation when the war ended, leading to the closure of the Surrey powder mills.

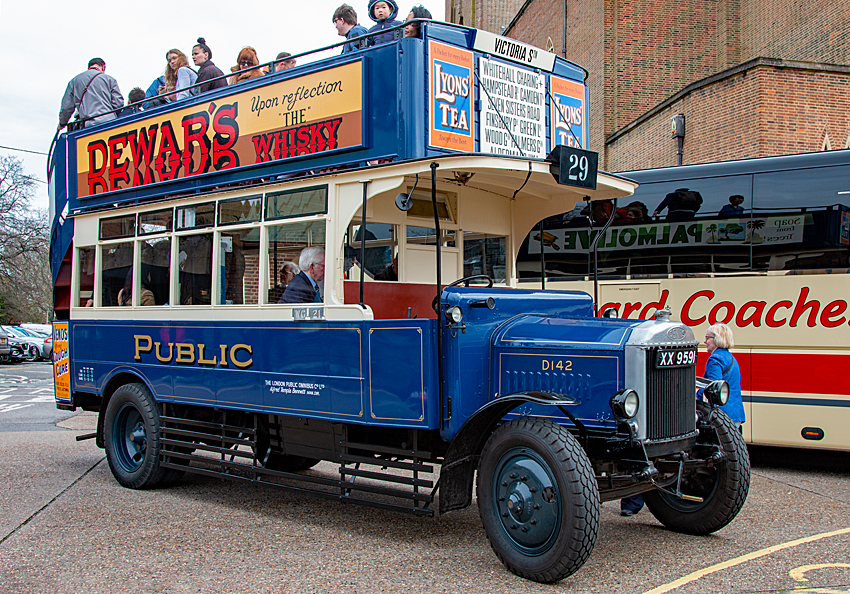
1924 Dennis open top double decker bus

New industrial developments included the establishment of the vehicle manufacturers Dennis Brothers in Guildford in 1895. Beginning as a maker of bicycles and then of cars, the firm soon shifted into the production of commercial and utility vehicles, becoming internationally important as a manufacturer of fire engines and buses. Though much reduced in size and despite multiple changes of ownership, this business continued to operate in Guildford until 2020. Kingston and nearby Ham became a centre of aircraft manufacturing, with the establishment in 1912 of the Sopwith Aviation Company and in 1920 of its successor H.G. Hawker Engineering, which later became Hawker Aviation and then Hawker Siddeley.

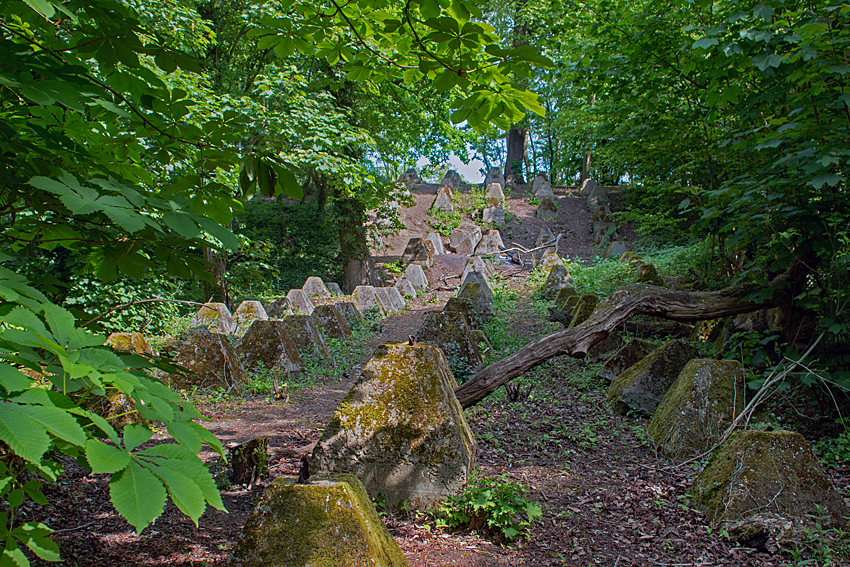
"Dragon's teeth" antitank obstacles by the River Wey

During the Second World War a section of the GHQ Stop Line, a system of pillboxes, gun emplacements, anti-tank obstacles and other fortifications, was constructed along the North Downs. This line, running from Somerset to Yorkshire, was intended as the principal fixed defence of London and the industrial core of England against the threat of invasion. German invasion plans envisaged that the main thrust of their advance inland would cross the North Downs at the gap in the ridge formed by the Wey valley, thus colliding with the defence line around Guildford.

Between the wars Croydon Airport, opened in 1920, served as the main airport for London, but it was superseded after the Second World War by Heathrow, and closed in 1959. Gatwick Airport, where commercial flights began in 1933, expanded greatly in the 1950s and 1960s, but the area occupied by the airport was transferred from Surrey to West Sussex in 1974.

In June 1972, British European Airways Flight 548 crashed near Staines just after taking off from Heathrow Airport. This remains the worst air accident in the UK.

== Historic architecture and monuments ==
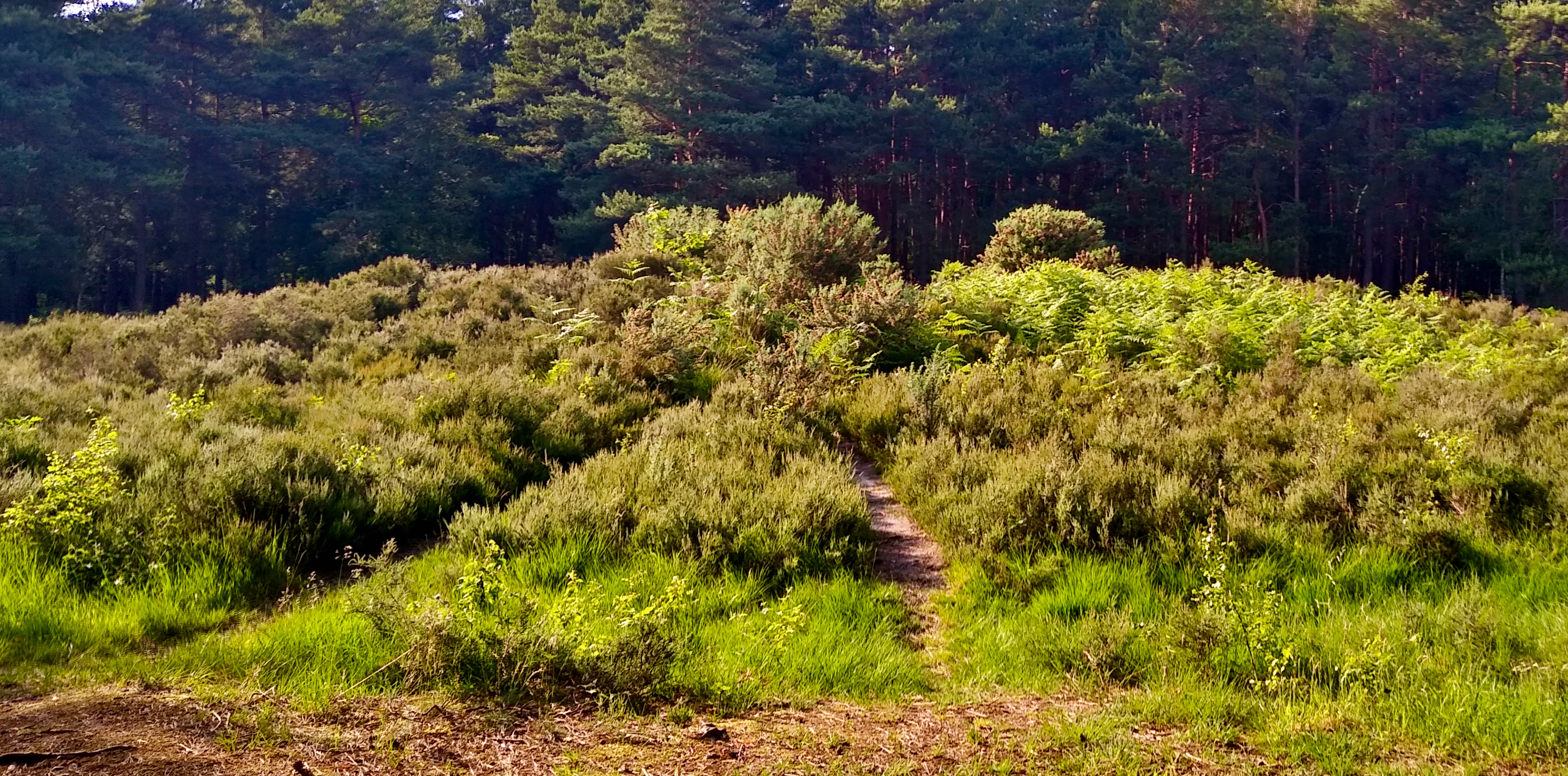
Bronze Age bell barrow on Horsell Common near Woking

Few traces of the ancient British and Roman periods survive in Surrey. There are a number of round barrows and bell barrows in various locations, mostly dating to the Bronze Age. Remains of Iron Age hillforts exist at Holmbury Hill, Hascombe Hill, Anstiebury (near Capel), Dry Hill (near Lingfield), St Ann's Hill (Chertsey) and St George's Hill (Weybridge). Most of these sites were created in the 1st century BC and many were re-occupied during the middle of the 1st century AD. Only fragments of Stane Street and Ermine Street, the Roman roads which crossed the county, remain.

Anglo-Saxon elements survive in a number of Surrey churches, notably at Guildford (St Mary), Godalming (St Peter & St Paul), Stoke D'Abernon (St Mary), Thursley, Witley, Compton and Albury (in Old Albury).

Numerous medieval churches exist in Surrey, but the county's parish churches are typically relatively small and simple, and experienced particularly widespread destruction and remodelling of their form in the course of Victorian restoration. Important medieval church interiors survive at Chaldon, Lingfield, Stoke D'Abernon, Compton and Dunsfold. Large monastic churches fell into ruin after their institutions were dissolved, although fragments of Waverley Abbey and Newark Priory survive. Southwark Priory, no longer in Surrey has survived, though much altered, and is now Southwark Cathedral. Farnham Castle largely retains its medieval structure, while the keep and fragments of the curtain walls and palace buildings survive at Guildford Castle.

Very little non-military secular architecture survives in Surrey from earlier than the 15th century. Wholly or partially surviving houses and barns from that century, with considerable later modifications, include those at Wanborough Manor, Bletchingley, Littleton, East Horsley, Ewhurst, Dockenfield, Lingfield, Limpsfield, Oxted, Crowhurst Place, Haslemere and Old Surrey Hall.

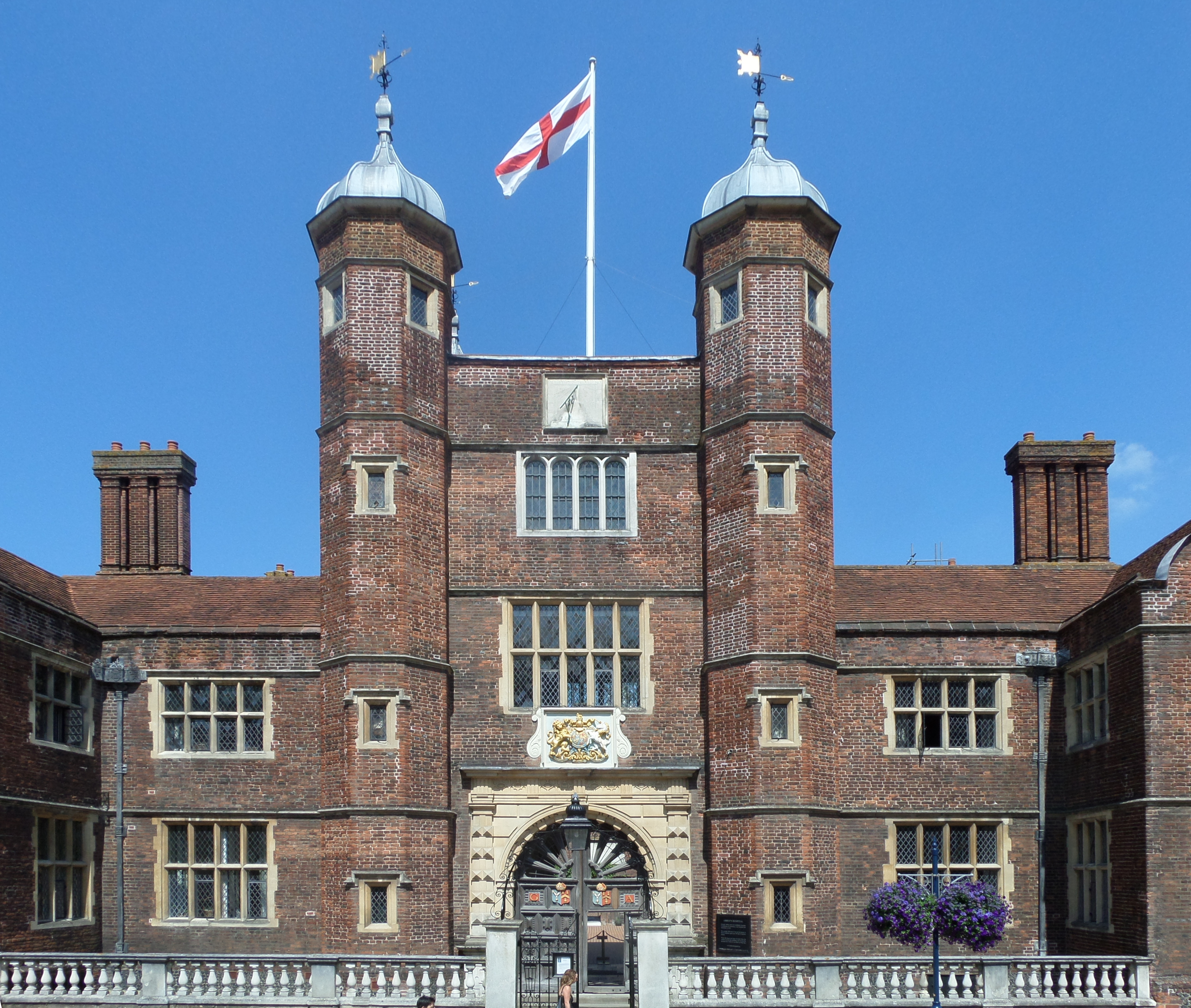
Abbot's Hospital, Guildford

Major examples of 16th-century architecture include the grand mid-century country houses of Loseley Park and Sutton Place and the old building of the Royal Grammar School, Guildford, founded in 1509. A considerable number of smaller houses and public houses of the 16th century are also still standing. From the 17th century the number of surviving buildings proliferates further. Abbot's Hospital, founded in 1619, is a grand edifice built in the Tudor style, despite its date. More characteristic examples of major 17th-century building include West Horsley Place, Slyfield Manor, and the Guildhall in Guildford.

== Local government ==
=== History ===
Surrey
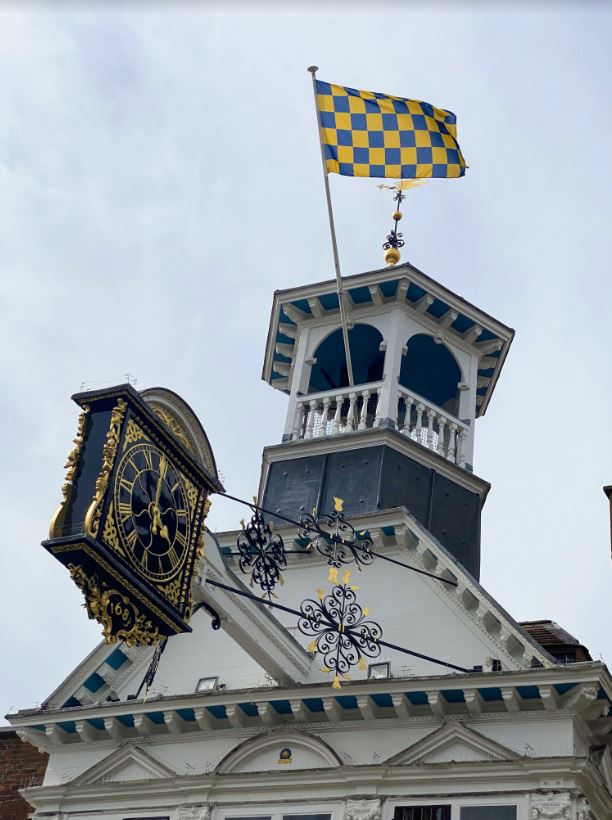
- The flag of Surrey flown at the Guildford Guildhall, 2022
- Population
  - 1891: 452,218
  - 1971: 1,002,832
- History
  - Created: c. 825
- Status: Administrative county
  - HQ: Newington 1889–1893; Kingston upon Thames 1893–2020; Reigate since 2020

The Local Government Act 1888 reorganised county-level local government throughout England and Wales. Accordingly, the administrative county of Surrey was formed in 1889 when the Provisional Surrey County Council first met, consisting of 19 aldermen and 57 councillors. The county council assumed the administrative responsibilities previously exercised by the county's justices in quarter sessions. The county had revised boundaries, with the north east of the historic county bordering the City of London becoming part of a new County of London. These areas now form the London Boroughs of Lambeth, Southwark and Wandsworth, and the Penge area of the London Borough of Bromley. At the same time, the borough of Croydon became a county borough, outside the jurisdiction of the county council.

For purposes other than local government the administrative county of Surrey and county borough of Croydon continued to form a "county of Surrey" to which a Lord Lieutenant and Custos Rotulorum (chief magistrate) and a High Sheriff were appointed.

Surrey had been administered from Newington since the 1790s, and the county council was initially based in the sessions house there. As Newington was included in the County of London, it lay outside the area administered by the council, and a site for a new county hall within the administrative county was sought. By 1890 six towns were being considered: Epsom, Guildford, Kingston, Redhill, Surbiton and Wimbledon. In 1891 it was decided to build the new County Hall at Kingston, and the building opened in 1893, but this site was also overtaken by the growing London conurbation, and by the 1930s most of the north of the county had been built over, becoming outer suburbs of London, although continuing to form part of Surrey administratively.

In 1960 the report of the Herbert Commission recommended that much of north Surrey (including Kingston and Croydon) be included in a new "Greater London". These recommendations were enacted in highly modified form in 1965 by the London Government Act 1963. The areas that now form the London Boroughs of Croydon, Kingston, Merton, and Sutton and that part of Richmond south of the River Thames, were transferred from Surrey to Greater London. At the same time part of the county of Middlesex, which had been abolished by the legislation, was added to Surrey. This area now forms the borough of Spelthorne.

Further local government reform under the Local Government Act 1972 took place in 1974. The 1972 Act abolished administrative counties and introduced non-metropolitan counties in their place. The boundaries of the non-metropolitan county of Surrey were similar to those of the administrative county with the exception of Gatwick Airport and some surrounding land which was transferred to West Sussex. It was originally proposed that the parishes of Horley and Charlwood would become part of West Sussex; however this met fierce local opposition and it was reversed by the Charlwood and Horley Act 1974.

Following the elections of May 2021 the County Councillors' party affiliations were as follows:

Party	Seats
Conservative	47
Residents Association/Independent	16
Liberal Democrats	14
Green	2
Labour	2

As of 2 May 2019, the Conservative local councillors controlled 4 out of 11 councils in Surrey, the Liberal Democrats controlled Mole Valley, the Residents Associations of Epsom and Ewell controlled Epsom and Ewell, and the remaining 5 are in No Overall Control. Of the five No Overall Control councils, Elmbridge and Waverley were both run by coalitions of Residents and Liberal Democrats, Guildford was run by a Liberal Democrats minority administration, and Tandridge and Woking were both run by Conservative minority administrations.

District boundaries in Surrey from 1 April 2027; West Surrey; East Surrey

As part of the proposed local government reorganisation in 2026, the existing twelve councils would be amalgamated into two unitary councils, East and West Surrey. East Surrey would consist of the former boroughs of Elmbridge, Mole Valley, Epsom and Ewell, Reigate and Banstead, and Tandridge. West Surrey would comprise Spelthorne, Surrey Heath, Runnymede, Woking, Guildford and Waverley. The change, once brought into law by parliament, would take effect in April 2027.

At Westminster the county is represented by 13 Parliamentary constituencies within the county borders. The Conservative Party holds seven seats and the Liberal Democrats hold six.

== Economy ==
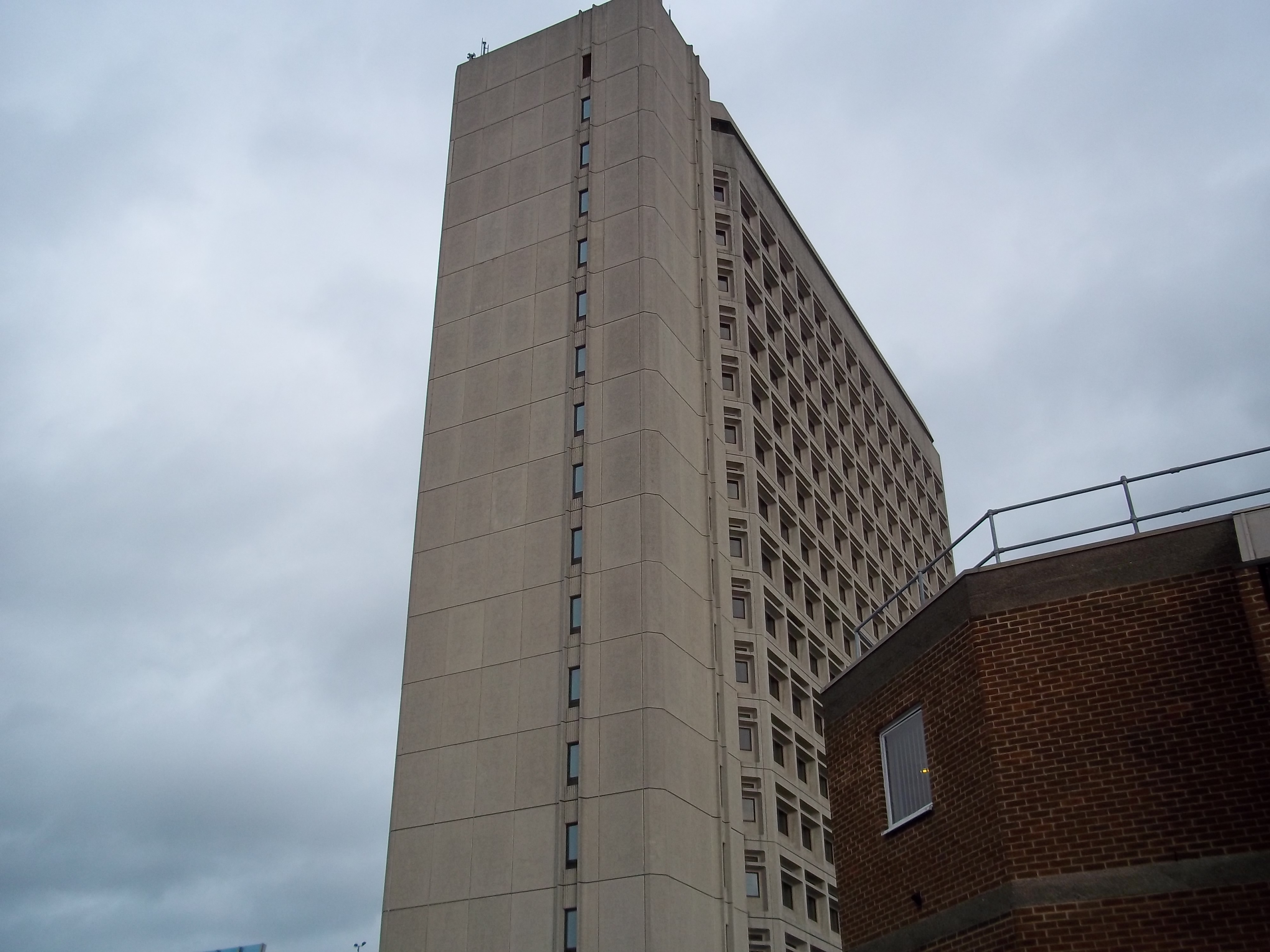
Export House in Woking, one of Surrey's tallest buildings

Surrey has a number of organisational and company headquarters, including electronics manufacturers Canon, Toshiba, Samsung and Philips distributors Burlodge, Future Electronics, Kia Motors and Toyota UK, the medico-pharma companies Pfizer and Sanofi-Aventis and oil giant Esso. Some of the largest fast-moving consumer goods multinationals in the world have their UK and/or European headquarters here, including Unilever, Procter & Gamble, Superdrug, Nestlé, SC Johnson, Kimberly-Clark and Colgate-Palmolive. NGOs including WWF UK & Compassion in World Farming are also based here.

== Transport ==
=== Road ===
Three major motorways pass through the county. These are:

- M25 (London Orbital) runs through the county, including a long cutting into the Reigate Hill-Walton Down scarp of the North Downs and has 8 junctions in the county.
  It connects among others to the M1, M11, M20, M26, M4 and M40. The motorway runs close to Heathrow Airport and the motorway network can be used to access Gatwick, Stansted and Luton Airports and the Channel Tunnel motor vehicle service.
- M3 crosses the north-west of the county. It connects London to Southampton and the South West of England having in Surrey the Sunbury-on-Thames, M25 interchange and the Lightwater and Bagshot junctions.
- M23 (north–south) in effect connects Croydon to Brighton as the dualled A23 trunk road to the north and beyond Crawley. It has junction to a spur to Gatwick Airport on the Surrey/Sussex border. It has a Surrey junction, the M25 Merstham interchange, close to the Reigate M25 junction.

Other major roads include:

- The A3 trunk road from Portsmouth to London. The road now bypasses and historically assisted in the growth of Haslemere, Godalming, Guildford, Esher and Kingston upon Thames. The Hindhead Tunnel bypasses a former bottleneck at Hindhead and the Devil's Punchbowl.
- The A24 from London to Littlehampton and Worthing. In Surrey, it passes through or around Ewell, Epsom, Ashtead, Leatherhead and Dorking. It passes Box Hill, near Dorking. Unlike the A3, which is almost completely dual carriageway, the A24 is, apart from a central Surrey stretch, single carriageway; it bypasses Leatherhead, Dorking and Horsham.
- The A31 trunk road heads west from Guildford to Bere Regis via Farnham and is connected to the M3 near Winchester and via the A331 near Aldershot. It is dual carriageway along the Hog's Back from the A3 to Farnham. It is one of the ancient routes from London to Winchester, see Pilgrims' Way.
- The short A331 connects the A31 to the M3. It runs along the Surrey-Hampshire border, bypassing Aldershot, Frimley and Farnborough.

=== Rail ===
Much of Surrey lies within the London commuter belt with regular services into Central London. South Western Railway is the sole train operator in Elmbridge, Runnymede, Spelthorne, Surrey Heath, Woking and Waverley, and the main train operator in the Borough of Guildford, running regular services into London Waterloo and regional services towards the south coast and South west. Southern is the main train operator in Mole Valley, Epsom and Ewell and Reigate and Banstead and the sole train operator in Tandridge, providing services into London Bridge and London Victoria.

There are many railway lines in the county, those of note include the Waterloo to Reading Line, South West Main Line, Portsmouth Direct Line, Sutton and Mole Valley Lines (from Horsham, West Sussex itself on the Arun Valley Line from Littlehampton) and the Brighton Main Line.

The Waterloo to Reading Line calls at Virginia Water, Egham, and Staines in Surrey. The South West Main Line calls at Woking and up to six other Surrey stops including Walton-on-Thames. The Portsmouth Direct Line is significant in linking Haslemere, Godalming and Guildford to the South West Main Line at Woking. The Sutton and Mole Valley Lines link Dorking, Leatherhead, Ashtead, Epsom to Waterloo via Ewell West or London Victoria via Ewell East. The Brighton Main Line calls at Horley and Redhill before reaching either London Bridge or London Victoria. Reigate is on the east–west North Downs Line.

Consequently, the towns Staines, Woking, Guildford, Walton-on-Thames, Epsom and Ewell and Reigate and Redhill, statistically the largest examples, are established rapid-transit commuter towns for Central London. The above routes have had a stimulative effect. The relative development of Surrey at the time of the Beeching cuts led to today's retention of numerous other commuter routes except the Cranleigh Line, all with direct services to London, including:

1. Chertsey Line linking the first two of the above national routes via Chertsey and Addlestone
2. New Guildford Line via Claygate and Effingham Junction from Surbiton
3. Hampton Court Branch Line to Hampton Court via Thames Ditton from Surbiton
4. Shepperton Branch Line via Sunbury
5. Ascot to Guildford Line via Wanborough, Ash, into Hampshire via Aldershot and back into Surrey to serve Frimley, Camberley and Bagshot.
6. Alton Line calls at the far southwest Surrey town, Farnham.
7. Epsom Downs Branch from Sutton and then Belmont in Greater London to Banstead and Epsom Downs.
8. Tattenham Corner Branch Line calls at Chipstead, Kingswood and Tadworth.
9. Oxted Line calls at Oxted and Hurst Green.
10. Redhill to Tonbridge Line serves Redhill and Godstone.

The only diesel route is the east–west North Downs Line, which runs from Reading via Guildford, Dorking Deepdene, Reigate and Redhill, thence to Gatwick Airport

The major stations in the county are Guildford (8.0 million passengers), Woking (7.4 million passengers), Epsom (3.6 million passengers), Redhill (3.6 million passengers) and Staines (2.9 million passengers).

=== Air ===
Both Heathrow (in the London Borough of Hillingdon) and Gatwick (in Crawley Borough, West Sussex) have a perimeter road in Surrey. First Berkshire & The Thames Valley operates a RailAir coach service from Guildford and Woking to Heathrow Airport and there are early-until-late buses to nearby Surrey towns.

Fairoaks Airport on the edge of Chobham and Ottershaw is 2.3 miles (3.7 km) from Woking town centre and operates as a private airfield with two training schools and is home to other aviation businesses.

Redhill Aerodrome is also in Surrey.

== Education ==
The UK has a comprehensive, state-funded education system, accordingly Surrey has 37 state secondary schools, 17 Academies, 7 sixth form colleges and 55 state primaries. The county has 41 independent schools, including Charterhouse (one of the nine independent schools mentioned in the Public Schools Act 1868) and the Royal Grammar School, Guildford. More than half the state secondary schools in Surrey have sixth forms. Brooklands (twinned with a site in Ashford, Surrey), Reigate, Esher, Egham, Woking and Waverley host sixth-form equivalent colleges each with technical specialisations and standard sixth-form study courses. Brooklands College offers aerospace and automotive design, engineering and allied study courses reflecting the aviation and motor industry leading UK research and maintenance hubs nearby.

=== Higher education ===
- The University of Surrey is based in Guildford
- The University for the Creative Arts (UCA) has campuses in Farnham and Epsom
- Royal Holloway, University of London is based in Egham
- The University of Law has a campus in Guildford
- The Guildford School of Acting is located on the Surrey University campus

== Emergency services ==
Surrey is served by the following emergency services:

- Air Ambulance Kent Surrey Sussex
- Surrey Police
- British Transport Police
- South East Coast Ambulance Service
- Surrey Fire & Rescue Service
- SURSAR

== Places of interest ==
Significant landscapes in Surrey include Box Hill just north of Dorking; the Devil's Punch Bowl at Hindhead and Frensham Common. Leith Hill southwest of Dorking in the Greensand Ridge is the second highest point in southeast England. Witley Common and Thursley Common are expansive areas of ancient heathland south of Godalming run by the National Trust and Ministry of Defence. The [Surrey Hills are an area of outstanding natural beauty (AONB).

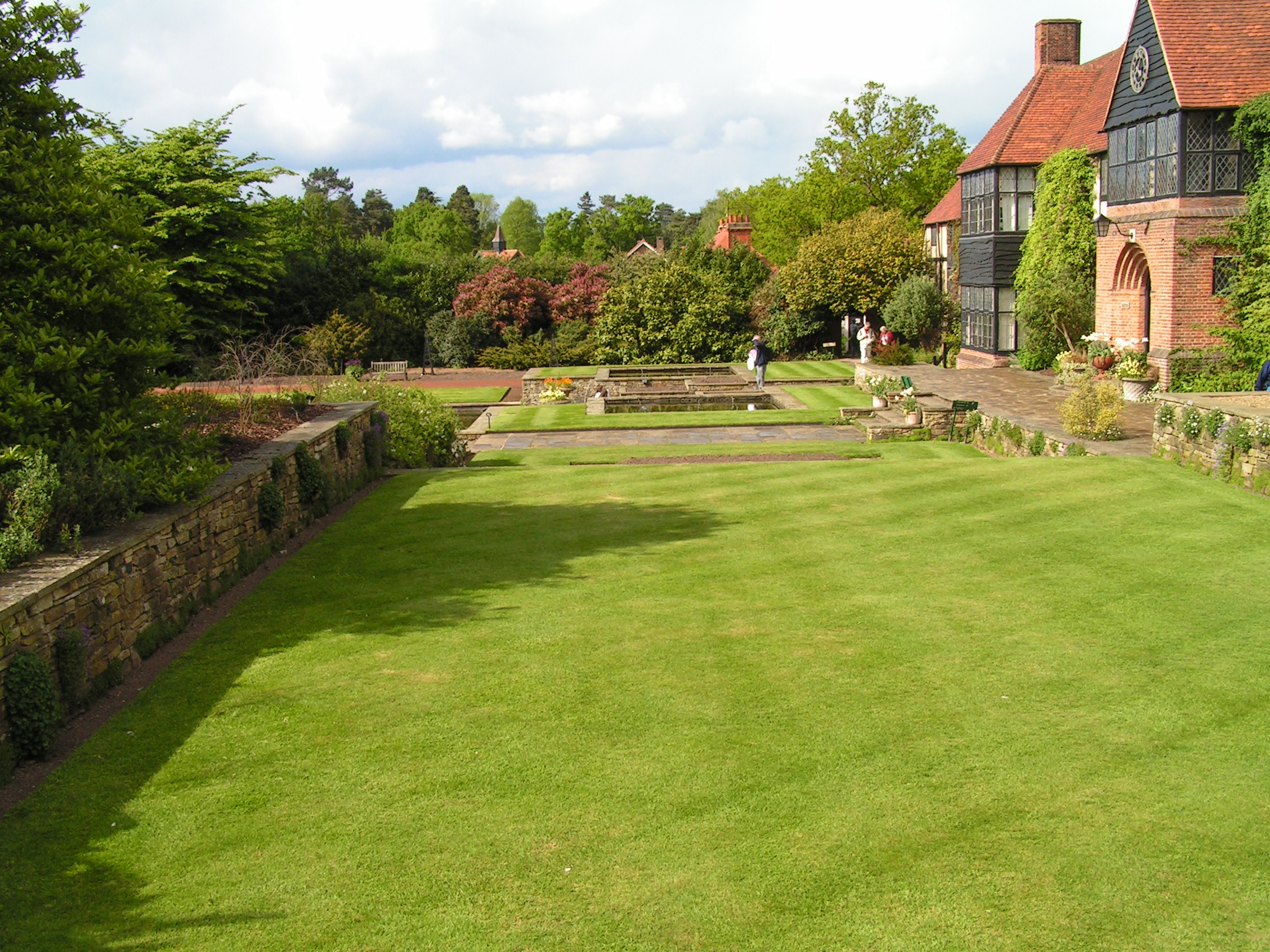
Lawns at RHS Garden, Wisley

More manicured landscapes can be seen at Claremont Landscape Garden, south of Esher (dating from 1715). There is also Winkworth Arboretum southeast of Godalming and Windlesham Arboretum near Lightwater created in the 20th century. Wisley is home to the Royal Horticultural Society gardens. Kew, historically part of Surrey but now in Greater London, features the Royal Botanic Gardens, Kew, as well as The National Archives for England & Wales.

There are 80 Surrey Wildlife Trust reserves with at least one in all 11 non-metropolitan districts.

Surrey's important country houses include the Tudor mansion of Loseley Park, built in the 1560s and Clandon House, an 18th-century Palladian mansion in West Clandon to the east of Guildford. Nearby Hatchlands Park in East Clandon, was built in 1758 with Robert Adam interiors and a collection of keyboard instruments. Polesden Lacey south of Great Bookham is a regency villa with extensive grounds. On a smaller scale, Oakhurst Cottage in Hambledon near Godalming is a restored 16th-century worker's home. Shalford Mill, on the Tillingbourne, is an 18th-century water-mill.

A canal system, the Wey and Godalming Navigations is administered at Dapdune Wharf in Guildford, where an exhibition commemorates the work of the canal system and is home to a restored Wey barge, the Reliance. The Wey and Arun Canal is being restored by volunteers with hopes of a future full reopening.

Runnymede at Egham is the site of the sealing of Magna Carta in 1215.

Guildford Cathedral is a 20th-century cathedral built from bricks made from the clay of the hill on which it stands.

Brooklands Museum recognises the motoring and aeronautical past of Surrey. The county is also home to the Thorpe Park theme park.

== Sport ==
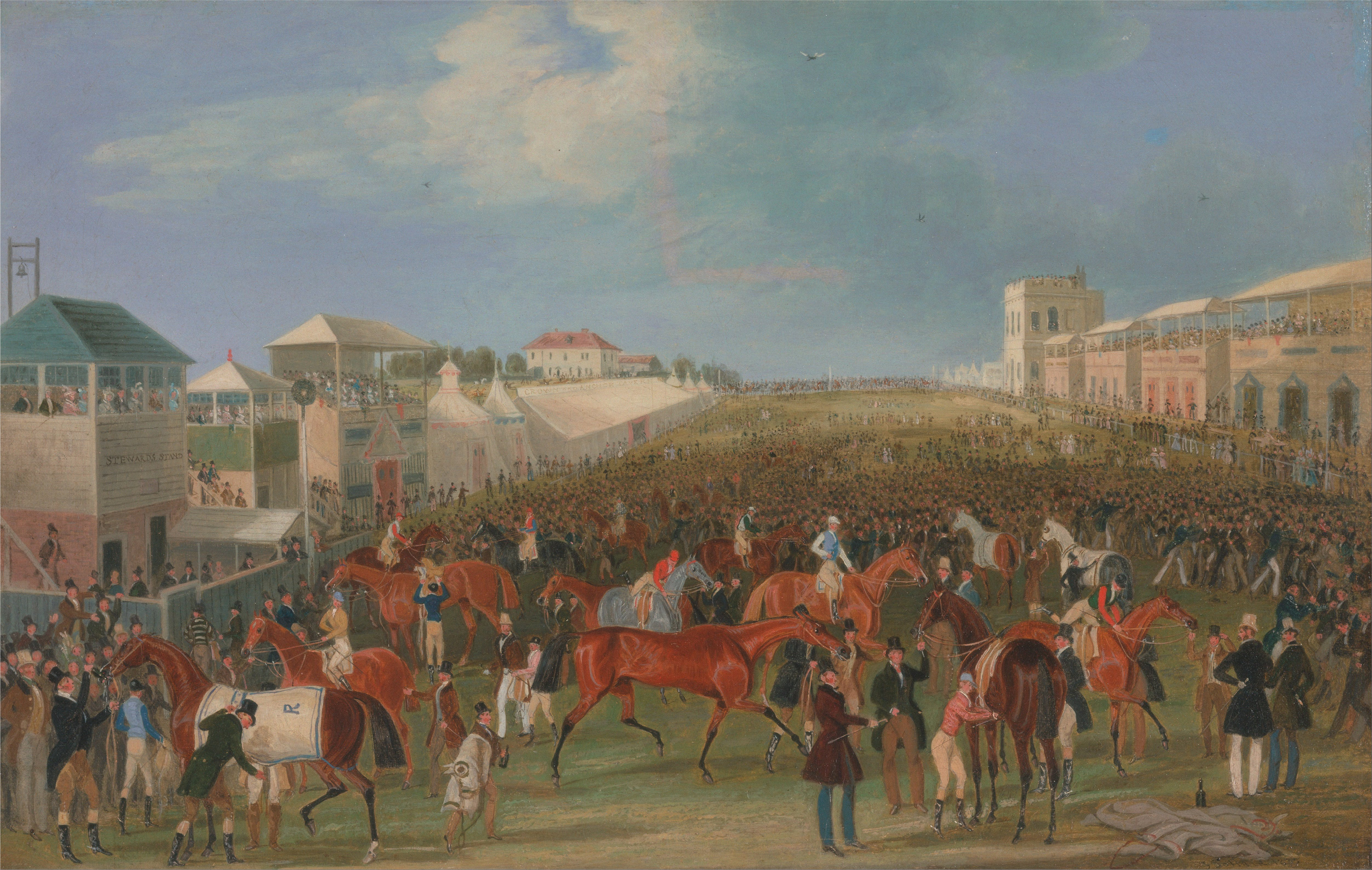
Epsom is famous for the Epsom Downs Racecourse which hosts the Epsom Derby; painting by James Pollard, c. 1835

- Cricket makes its first appearance in history in Surrey, in a reference to the game being played at the Royal Grammar School, Guildford in the 16th century (see History of English cricket to 1696). Mitcham Cricket Club, formed in 1685 and the oldest documented club in the game's history, was within Surrey's borders until 1965. The Surrey County Cricket Club has been based at The Oval in Kennington, now part of Greater London, since its foundation in 1845. The club also uses Whitgift School in South Croydon and Woodbridge Road in Guildford for some games. It was one of the original participants in the County Championship and has won the competition 19 times outright and once jointly, more than any other county except Yorkshire.
- Epsom Downs Racecourse is the venue for the most prestigious event in British flat horse-racing, the Derby, which has been held there most years since 1780. Surrey is also home to Lingfield, Kempton and Sandown Park Racecourses, presenting an unusually high concentration in one county.
- Brooklands between Woking and Weybridge was the world's first purpose-built motorsport race circuit, opened in 1907. The headquarters of the McLaren Formula One team are at Woking. James Hunt, the 1976 Formula 1 World Driver's Champion was born in Belmont, Sutton, then part of Surrey, in 1947.
- The All England Lawn Tennis Club, venue for the Wimbledon Championships, and the headquarters of the Lawn Tennis Association were within Surrey until 1965.
- Surrey's leading rugby club, Esher, currently compete in the National League 1, the third tier of English rugby. Harlequins F.C. and Harlequins Women train at the Surrey Sports Park in Guildford.
- Surrey is one of a handful of English counties with no teams in the top 92 football teams, the Football League. Its leading team is Woking, currently playing in the fifth-tier National League.
- Surrey is home to the ice hockey team the Guildford Flames, who compete in the top-tier Elite Ice Hockey League.
- The basketball team Surrey Scorchers, based in Guildford, play in the top tier of British basketball, the British Basketball League.
- The netball team Surrey Storm, based in Guildford play in the Netball Superleague. They are the franchise for the Greater London area and the South East.
- Golf has been played in the county since before 1900 most notably as international venue Wentworth; by 2013 a 142nd co-existing Surrey golf course was in planning consultation; 141 were recorded by The Daily Telegraph newspaper.
- Rowing clubs include Molesey (with an elite development programme hosting several leading British Rowing crews), Walton, (one of the UK's top clubs in the junior category), Weybridge, Weybridge Ladies, Weybridge Mariners, Burway, Staines and Guildford whose top female quad boat won Henley Women's in 2012.
- Volleyball teams include BA, Friends Provident and Guildford International Volleyball Club (whose elite men's team has won the 1st of the 4 National Divisions), while twelve clubs in Surrey and three in south-west Greater London compete in the Surrey Volleyball League.

=== Surrey football clubs ===
The county has numerous football teams. In the Combined Counties League can be found the likes of Ash United, Badshot Lea, Banstead Athletic, Camberley Town, Chessington & Hook United, Cobham, Epsom & Ewell, Epsom Athletic, Farleigh Rovers, Farnham Town, Frimley Green, Horley Town, Knaphill, Mole Valley SCR, Molesey, Sheerwater, Spelthorne Sports and Westfield; Lingfield play at the same level but in the Southern Combination; Ashford Town, Chertsey Town, Godalming Town and Guildford City play higher in the Southern League; equally Leatherhead, Merstham, Redhill, South Park, Staines Town, Walton Casuals and Walton and Hersham are in the Isthmian; Dorking Wanderers and Woking are currently the highest ranked Surrey based clubs, playing in the National League.

Chelsea F.C. practice at the Cobham Training Centre located in the village of Stoke d'Abernon near Cobham, Surrey. The training ground was built in 2004 and officially opened in 2007.

== In popular culture ==
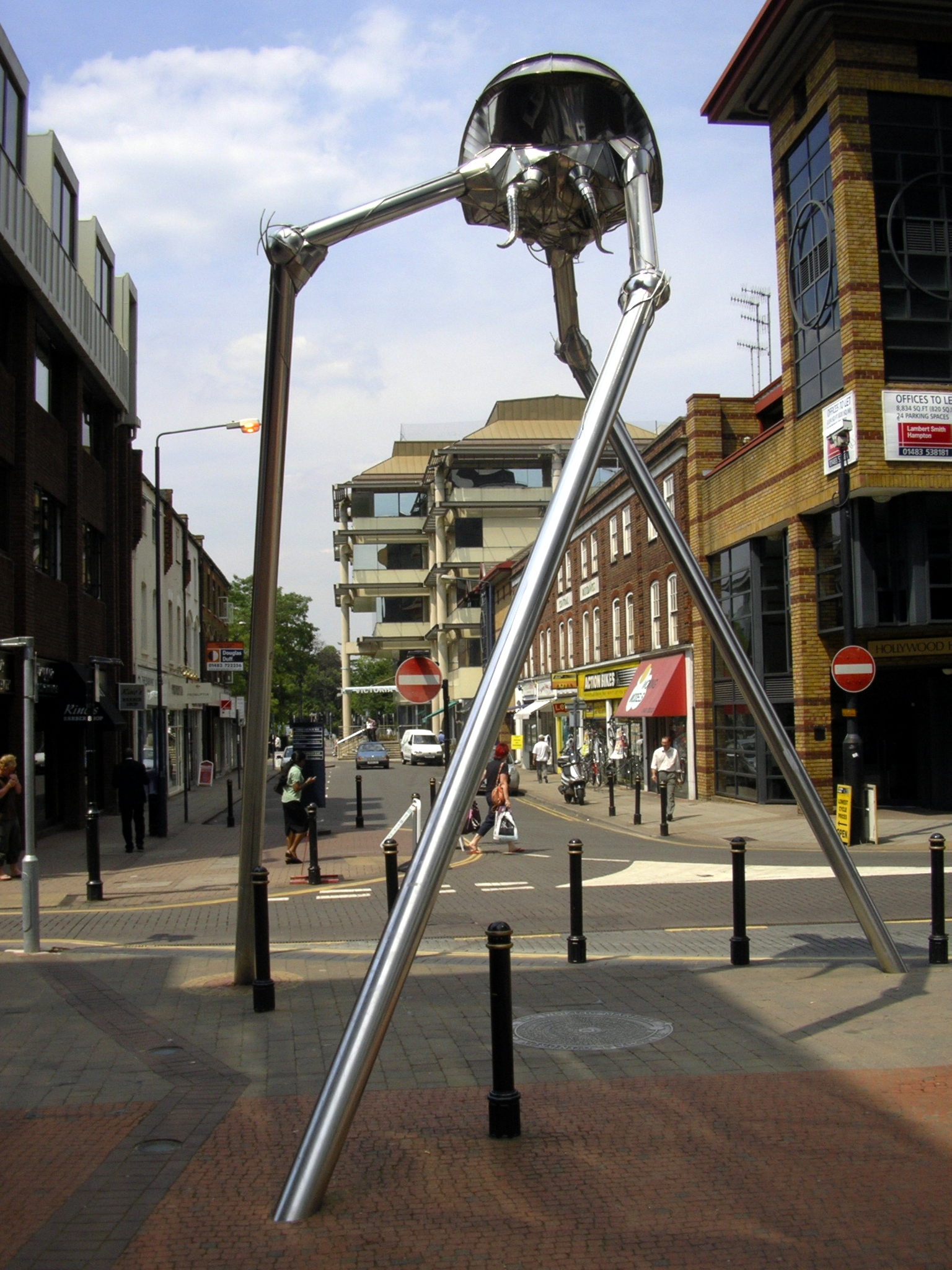
Statue of a Martian tripod in Woking

The opening of H. G. Wells 1898 novel War of the Worlds is set on Horsell Common near Woking.

A key scene of Jane Austen's 1815 novel Emma takes place on Box Hill.

The county is the setting of the fictional town of Little Whinging, where Harry Potter was raised in the books by J.K. Rowling.

The county has also been used as a film location. In the 1976 film The Omen, the scenes at the cathedral were filmed at Guildford Cathedral.

== Notable people ==
=== Royal Family ===
- Lady Louise Windsor (born 2003) and James, Earl of Wessex (born 2007), children of Prince Edward, Duke of Edinburgh and grandchildren of Queen Elizabeth II, were born in Frimley Park Hospital.

=== Literature ===
Besides its role in Elizabethan and Jacobean theatre, many important writers have lived and worked in Surrey.

- The Owl and the Nightingale, one of the earliest Middle English poems; Nicholas of Guildford is mentioned in it several times.
- John Donne (1572–1631) lived and worked for a time in Pyrford.
- John Evelyn (1620–1706) was born and spent much of his life in Wotton, and is buried there.
- Daniel Defoe (1659/61–1731) was educated in Dorking.
- William Cobbett (1763–1835) was born and raised in Farnham, later lived in Wyke, where he died, and is buried in Farnham; Surrey features prominently in his Rural Rides.
- Thomas Love Peacock (1785–1866) lived in Lower Halliford, then part of Middlesex, now in Surrey.
- Benjamin Disraeli (1804–1881) wrote Coningsby while living in Dorking.
- Alfred Tennyson (1809–1892) spent the latter part of his life, and died, in Haslemere.
- Charles Dickens (1812–1870) wrote part of The Pickwick Papers in Dorking, and refers to the town in the novel.
- Robert Browning (1812–1889) was born in Camberwell, then part of Surrey.
- George Eliot (1819–1880) wrote most of Middlemarch while living in Haslemere.
- Matthew Arnold (1822–1888) lived in Laleham, then part of Middlesex, now in Surrey.
- George Meredith (1828–1909) lived at Box Hill.
- Lewis Carroll (1832–1898) spent much of his time at his sisters' home in Guildford, where he wrote Through the Looking-Glass; he died there and is buried in the town.
- Isabella Beeton (1836–1865) lived for several years in Epsom, where her step-father was clerk of the racecourse.
- George Bernard Shaw (1856–1950) lived in Woking and later in Hindhead, where he wrote Caesar and Cleopatra.
- Arthur Conan Doyle (1859–1930) lived and wrote many of his books in Hindhead and served as deputy lieutenant of Surrey; the county forms a setting for several of the Sherlock Holmes stories.
- J. M. Barrie (1860–1937) lived in Tilford, and based The Boy Castaways, which later evolved into Peter Pan, in the nearby countryside.
- H. G. Wells (1866–1946) wrote The War of the Worlds while living in Woking; much of northern Surrey is laid waste in the course of the story.
- John Galsworthy (1867–1933) was born in Kingston and the Forsyte Saga is partly set in the area.
- E. M. Forster (1879–1970) lived and wrote in Weybridge and Abinger Hammer.
- P. G. Wodehouse (1881–1975) was born in Guildford and baptised there in St Nicolas' Church.
- A. P. Herbert (1890–1971) was born in Ashtead.
- Aldous Huxley (1894–1963) was born and raised in Godalming and his ashes are interred at Compton; the end of Brave New World is set in Surrey.
- Robert Graves (1895–1985) was born in Wimbledon, then part of Surrey.
- Rosemary Sutcliff (1920–1992) was born in East Clandon.
- Clive King (1924–2018) was born in Richmond, then part of Surrey.
- John Osborne (1929–1994) grew up in Stoneleigh.
- Kazuo Ishiguro (born 1954) grew up in Guildford.

=== Arts and sciences ===
- William of Ockham (c. 1288–1347), scholastic philosopher, most famous for "Occam's Razor", came from Ockham.
- Thomas Malthus (1766–1834), pioneer of demography, was born and raised in Westcott, and later lived in Albury.
- Ada Lovelace (1815–1852), mathematician, lived at East Horsley.
- Eadweard Muybridge (1830–1904), photographer, was born and raised in Kingston, then part of Surrey.
- Gertrude Jekyll (1843–1932), garden designer, lived for much of her life at Munstead near Godalming, created significant gardens in Surrey and is buried in Busbridge.
- Ethel Frances Chawner (1866-1943) Entomologist born in Surrey who lived there 1866-1888.
- Edwin Lutyens (1869–1944), architect, grew up in Thursley; many of his early works were built in Surrey, including collaborations with Gertrude Jekyll.
- Ralph Vaughan Williams (1872–1958), composer, grew up at Leith Hill and later lived in Dorking.
- Laurence Olivier (1907–1989), actor, was born in Dorking.
- Peggy Ashcroft (1907–1991), actress, was born and raised in Croydon, then part of Surrey.
- David Lean (1908–1991), film director, was born in Croydon.
- Alan Turing (1912–1954), mathematician and pioneer of computer science, lived for much of his early life in Guildford.
- Jimmy Perry (1923–2016), actor and screenwriter, was born in Barnes, then part of Surrey.
- Richard Briers (1934–2013), actor, was born in Raynes Park, then part of Surrey.
- Brian Blessed (born 1936), actor, lives in Lightwater and was ambassador to the 2024 'Surrey Day' event.
- Roy Hudd (1936–2020), comedian and actor, was born and raised in Croydon.
- Alex Kingston (born 1963), actress, was born and raised in Epsom.
- Tracey Emin (born 1963), artist, was born in Croydon.
- Simone Ashley (born 1995), actress, was born in Camberley.
- Tom Holland (actor) (born 1996) came from Kingston Upon Thames.

=== Military ===
- Edward Hawke, 1st Baron Hawke (1705–1781), admiral, lived at Sunbury-on-Thames, then part of Middlesex, now in Surrey.
- F. C. Ricardo (1852–1924), colonel, was born in Guildford.
- Francis Aylmer Maxwell (1871–1917), brigadier, was born in Guildford.
- Alfred Carpenter (1881–1955), admiral, was born in Barnes, then part of Surrey.
- Martin Dunbar-Nasmith (1883–1965), admiral, was born in Barnes, then part of Surrey.
- Bernard Freyberg, 1st Baron Freyberg (1889–1963), lieutenant-general, was born in Richmond, then part of Surrey.
- Alfred Victor Smith (1891–1915), lieutenant and Victoria Cross recipient, was born in Guildford.
- Raymond Sandover (1910–1995), brigadier, was born in Richmond, then part of Surrey.
- Gilbert White (1912–1977), brigadier, was born in Farnham.
- Dominic Bruce (1915–2000), flight lieutenant and Colditz escapee, lived for most of his life after the Second World War in Sunbury-on-Thames.
- John Cunningham (1917–2002), air ace, was born in Croydon, then part of Surrey.

=== Popular music ===
The "Surrey Delta" produced many of the musicians in 1960s British blues movements. The Rolling Stones developed their music at the Crawdaddy Club in Richmond.

- Roger Waters (born 1943) was born in Great Bookham, a village in Surrey.
- Jimmy Page (born 1944) spent much of his early life in Epsom.
- Jeff Beck (1944–2023) was born in Wallington, then part of Surrey.
- Eric Clapton (born 1945) was born and grew up in Ripley.
- Peter Gabriel (born 1950) was born in Chobham and grew up in Surrey. His band Genesis was formed at the Charterhouse School in Godalming.
- Paul Weller (born 1958) was born and grew up in Woking, which inspired the song "Town Called Malice" and formed The Jam at Sheerwater Secondary School in 1972.
- The Stranglers were formed in Guildford in 1974.
- Sham 69 were formed in Hersham in 1975.
- The Vapors were formed in Guildford in 1978.
- Kirsty MacColl (1959–2000) was born in Croydon, then part of Surrey.
- Norman Cook, also known as Fatboy Slim (born 1963), grew up in Reigate.
- Andrew Ridgeley (born 1963), member of Wham!, was born in Windlesham.
- Georgia Buchanan, also known as Call Me Loop (born 1991), was born in Surrey.
- Hard-Fi members Richard Archer, Ross Phillips and Kai Stephens are from Staines-upon-Thames.
- Justin Hawkins, lead singer of rock band the Darkness, was born in Surrey.
- Disclosure members Guy and Howard Lawrence are from Reigate.
- Keith Relf (1943–1976) was born and grew up in Richmond, then part of Surrey.
- Jane Relf (born 1947) was born and grew up in Richmond, then part of Surrey.
- Holly-Anne Hull (born 1994), singer and actress, was born in Camberley with the group meeting whilst studying at Sixth Form College, Farnborough.
- Henry Moodie (born 2004) was born in Guilford.

=== Sport ===
- Max Hall (born 1975), cricketer
- Graham Thorpe (1969–2024), cricketer, was born in and played for Surrey.
- Luke Shaw (born 1995), footballer, was born in Kingston upon Thames
- Harvey Elliott (born 2003), footballer
- Gregory Slade (born 2002), Wheelchair Tennis Player, was born in Redhill, Surrey
- Arvid Lindblad (born 2007), Formula One driver

=== Other ===
- Ethel Caterham (born 1909), a Supercentenarian, and current oldest living person, aged 117 years, 91 days old. The last known surviving individual born in the 1900s decade, Caterham has lived in a care home in Lightwater since 2020. On 18 September 2025, Caterham met King Charles III.
- Steve Backshall (born 1973), naturalist and television presenter, was born in Bagshot.
- Sarah Finch (born 1964), environmentalist and Goldman Prize recipient
- Peter Hogg (1913-2000), naturalist and friend of Alan Turing

== See also ==
- List of Lord Lieutenants of Surrey
- List of High Sheriffs of Surrey
- List of English and Welsh endowed schools (19th century)#Surrey
- Custos Rotulorum of Surrey—Keepers of the Rolls
- Surrey (UK Parliament constituency)—Historical list of MPs for Surrey constituency
- Surrey (carriage)
- Healthcare in Surrey
- Surrey Police and Crime Commissioner

== Bibliography ==
- Bathurst, David (2012). Walking the county high points of England. Chichester: Summersdale. ISBN 978-1-84-953239-6.
- Bird, David (2004). Roman Surrey. Stroud: Tempus. ISBN 978-0-75-242889-5.
- Brandon, Peter; Short, Brian (1990). The South East from AD 1000. London: Longman. ISBN 978-0-58-249245-5.
- Brandon, Peter (1998). A History of Surrey. Chichester: Phillimore. ISBN 978-0-85-033303-9.
- Campbell, Heather M, ed. (2009). The Britannica Guide to Political Science and Social Movements That Changed the Modern World. New York: The Rosen Publishing Group. ISBN 978-1-61-530062-4.
- Cannon, John, ed. (2009). "Surrey". A Dictionary of British History (Revised ed.). Oxford University Press.
- Crocker, Crocker; Crocker, Alan (2000). Damnable Inventions: Chilworth Gunpowder and the Paper Mills of the Tillingbourne. Guildford: Surrey Industrial History Group. ISBN 978-0-95-381220-2.
- Drewett, Peter; Rudling, David; Gardiner, Mark (1988). The South East to AD 1000. London: Longman. ISBN 978-0-58-249272-1.
- Dyer, James (1982). Penguin Guide to Prehistoric England & Wales. Harmondsworth: Penguin. ISBN 978-0-14-046351-4.
- Gwynne, Peter (1990). A History of Crawley (1st ed.). Chichester: Phillimore & Co. ISBN 0-85033-718-6.
- Hadfield, Charles (1969). The canals of south and south east England. Newton Abbott: David & Charles. ISBN 978-0-71-534693-8.
- Kirby, D. P. (2000). The earliest English Kings (Revised ed.). London: Routledge. ISBN 978-0-41-524211-0.
- Nairn, Ian; Pevsner, Nikolaus; Cherry, Bridget (1971). Surrey. The Buildings of England (2nd ed.). London: Penguin. ISBN 978-0-14-071021-2.
- Swanton, Michael, ed. (2000). The Anglo-Saxon Chronicles. London: Phoenix. ISBN 978-1-84-212003-3.
- Vine, P.A.L. (1996). London's lost route to the sea: An historical account of the inland navigations which linked the Thames to the English Channel (5th ed.). Midhurst: Middleton Press. ISBN 1-873793-782.
- Weinreb, Ben; Hibbert, Christopher (1992). The London Encyclopaedia (reprint ed.). Macmillan.
- Yorke, Barbara (1990). Kings and Kingdoms of Early Anglo-Saxon Kingdom. London: Routledge. ISBN 9780415166393.
