= List of civil parishes in Surrey =

This is a list of civil parishes in the ceremonial county of Surrey, England. There are 87 civil parishes.

Population figures are unavailable for some of the smallest parishes.

The whole of the districts of Woking, Epsom and Ewell, Spelthorne and Runnymede are unparished. The whole of former districts of Walton and Weybridge Urban District, Guildford Municipal Borough, Leatherhead Urban District, Frimley and Camberley Urban District, Banstead Urban District and Reigate Municipal Borough are unparished. Parts of the former Esher Urban District and Dorking Urban District are unparished.

Parishes in Box Hill, Dorking and Westcott will be established in 2027.

| Civil Parish | Civil Parish Population 2011 | Area (km^{2}) 2011 | Pre 1974 District | District |
|---|---|---|---|---|
| Abinger | 1,905 | 30.17 | Dorking and Horley Rural District | Mole Valley |
| Albury | 1,191 | 16.28 | Guildford Rural District | Guildford |
| Alfold | 1,059 | 15.11 | Hambledon Rural District | Waverley |
| Artington | 359 | 4.93 | Guildford Rural District | Guildford |
| Ash | 17,166 | 9.73 | Guildford Rural District | Guildford |
| Betchworth | 1,052 | 9.91 | Dorking and Horley Rural District | Mole Valley |
| Bisley | 3,965 | 3.66 | Bagshot Rural District | Surrey Heath |
| Bletchingley | 2,973 | 23.44 | Godstone Rural District | Tandridge |
| Bramley | 3,559 | 18.87 | Hambledon Rural District | Waverley |
| Brockham | 2,868 | 6.90 | Dorking Urban District | Mole Valley |
| Buckland | 562 | 5.51 | Dorking and Horley Rural District | Mole Valley |
| Burstow | 4,333 | 11.37 | Godstone Rural District | Tandridge |
| Capel | 3,832 | 26.13 | Dorking and Horley Rural District | Mole Valley |
| Caterham on the Hill | 12,742 | 3.52 | Caterham and Warlingham Urban District | Tandridge |
| Caterham Valley | 8,348 | 5.88 | Caterham and Warlingham Urban District | Tandridge |
| Chaldon | 1,735 | 4.72 | Caterham and Warlingham Urban District | Tandridge |
| Charlwood | 2,326 | 14.56 | Dorking and Horley Rural District | Mole Valley |
| Chelsham and Farleigh | 865 | 14.91 | Godstone Rural District | Tandridge |
| Chiddingfold | 2,960 | 28.18 | Hambledon Rural District | Waverley |
| Chobham | 3,799 | 23.13 | Bagshot Rural District | Surrey Heath |
| Churt | 1,202 | 4.68 | Haslemere Urban District | Waverley |
| Claygate | 7,168 | 4.71 | Esher Urban District | Elmbridge |
| Compton | 1,154 | 8.42 | Guildford Rural District | Guildford |
| Cranleigh | 11,492 | 32.78 | Hambledon Rural District | Waverley |
| Crowhurst | 281 | 9.70 | Godstone Rural District | Tandridge |
| Dockenfield | 399 | 2.73 | Hambledon Rural District | Waverley |
| Dormansland | 3,519 | 27.16 | Godstone Rural District | Tandridge |
| Dunsfold | 989 | 16.06 | Hambledon Rural District | Waverley |
| East Clandon | 268 | 5.86 | Guildford Rural District | Guildford |
| East Horsley | 4,290 | 7.40 | Guildford Rural District | Guildford |
| Effingham | 2,711 | 11.98 | Guildford Rural District | Guildford |
| Elstead | 2,557 | 11.03 | Hambledon Rural District | Waverley |
| Ewhurst | 2,480 | 23.78 | Hambledon Rural District | Waverley |
| Farnham (town) | 39,488 | 36.53 | Farnham Urban District | Waverley |
| Felbridge | 2,096 | 8.49 | Godstone Rural District | Tandridge |
| Frensham | 1,689 | 16.20 | Hambledon Rural District | Waverley |
| Godalming (town) | 21,804 | 9.68 | Godalming Municipal Borough | Waverley |
| Godstone | 5,949 | 18.06 | Godstone Rural District | Tandridge |
| Hambledon | 805 | 11.11 | Hambledon Rural District | Waverley |
| Hascombe | 307 | 5.25 | Hambledon Rural District | Waverley |
| Haslemere (town) | 16,826 | 23.26 | Haslemere Urban District | Waverley |
| Headley | 643 | 6.75 | Dorking and Horley Rural District | Mole Valley |
| Holmwood | 895 | 7.72 | Dorking and Horley Rural District | Mole Valley |
| Horley (town) | 22,076 | 11.24 | Dorking and Horley Rural District | Reigate and Banstead |
| Horne | 811 | 14.19 | Godstone Rural District | Tandridge |
| Leigh | 943 | 13.82 | Dorking and Horley Rural District | Mole Valley |
| Limpsfield | 3,569 | 18.54 | Godstone Rural District | Tandridge |
| Lingfield | 4,467 | 8.76 | Godstone Rural District | Tandridge |
| Mickleham | 585 | 7.31 | Dorking Urban District | Mole Valley |
| Munstead and Tuesley | 779 | 9.92 | Hambledon Rural District | Waverley |
| Newdigate | 1,749 | 19.19 | Dorking and Horley Rural District | Mole Valley |
| Normandy | 2,981 | 16.37 | Guildford Rural District | Guildford |
| Nutfield | 2,673 | 9.80 | Godstone Rural District | Tandridge |
| Ockham | 410 | 12.13 | Guildford Rural District | Guildford |
| Ockley | 871 | 13.74 | Dorking and Horley Rural District | Mole Valley |
| Outwood | 720 | 11.09 | Godstone Rural District | Tandridge |
| Oxted | 11,314 | 15.14 | Godstone Rural District | Tandridge |
| Peper Harow | 185 | 5.34 | Hambledon Rural District | Waverley |
| Pirbright | 3,691 | 19.02 | Guildford Rural District | Guildford |
| Puttenham | 601 | 7.87 | Guildford Rural District | Guildford |
| Ripley | 2,029 | 9.73 | Guildford Rural District | Guildford |
| Salfords and Sidlow | 3,185 | 18.75 | Dorking and Horley Rural District | Reigate and Banstead |
| Seale and Sands | 907 | 8.86 | Guildford Rural District | Guildford |
| Send | 4,245 | 6.95 | Guildford Rural District | Guildford |
| Shackleford | 770 | 8.02 | Guildford Rural District | Guildford |
| Shalford | 4,142 | 6.51 | Guildford Rural District | Guildford |
| Shere | 3,630 | 24.51 | Guildford Rural District | Guildford |
| St Martha | 677 | 3.44 | Guildford Rural District | Guildford |
| Tandridge | 663 | 10.98 | Godstone Rural District | Tandridge |
| Tatsfield | 1,863 | 13.36 | Godstone Rural District | Tandridge |
| Thursley | 651 | 19.85 | Hambledon Rural District | Waverley |
| Tilford | 799 | 9.87 | Hambledon Rural District | Waverley |
| Titsey | | | Godstone Rural District | Tandridge |
| Tongham | 2,314 | 3.29 | Guildford Rural District | Guildford |
| Wanborough | 335 | 7.57 | Guildford Rural District | Guildford |
| Warlingham | 8,036 | 6.01 | Caterham and Warlingham Urban District | Tandridge |
| West Clandon | 1,363 | 9.58 | Guildford Rural District | Guildford |
| West End | 4,693 | 14.52 | Bagshot Rural District | Surrey Heath |
| West Horsley | 2,828 | 10.84 | Guildford Rural District | Guildford |
| Whyteleafe | 3,900 | 2.17 | Caterham and Warlingham Urban District | Tandridge |
| Windlesham | 16,775 | 22.40 | Bagshot Rural District | Surrey Heath |
| Wisley | 185 | 4.03 | Guildford Rural District | Guildford |
| Witley and Milford | 8,130 | 27.76 | Hambledon Rural District | Waverley |
| Woldingham | 2,141 | 10.87 | Caterham and Warlingham Urban District | Tandridge |
| Wonersh | 3,412 | 17.18 | Hambledon Rural District | Waverley |
| Worplesdon | 8,529 | 17.94 | Guildford Rural District | Guildford |
| Wotton | 583 | 22.43 | Dorking and Horley Rural District | Mole Valley |

== See also ==
- List of civil parishes in England
