= List of civil parishes in Greater London =

This is a list of civil parishes in the ceremonial county of Greater London. There is currently just one civil parish in Greater London, since all were abolished in 1965. Before this date the civil parish had only a nominal role as all parish councils in the area had been abolished by 1936. The right to create civil parishes in London boroughs was reintroduced by the Local Government and Public Involvement in Health Act 2007. The City of London is a ceremonial county in its own right and is listed separately.

== List of current parishes ==
- Queen's Park parish in the City of Westminster was created on 1 April 2014. The local council is Queen's Park Community Council.
- The rest of Greater London is unparished.

== List of parishes abolished in 1965 ==
This is a list of civil parishes in Greater London that were abolished on 1 April 1965 by the London Government Act 1963. Many were ancient parishes or chapelries that had survived through various waves of reform. Others were created as a result of amalgamations over the years. In some places the parishes were identical to local government districts. By 1965 they were all urban parishes and had only nominal existence. They ceased to be routinely used for census reporting after 1951. The largest parish by area was Orpington (20,842 acres), which corresponded to Orpington Urban District. The smallest was New Brentford (213 acres). The largest parish by population was Wandsworth (330,493), which corresponded to the Metropolitan Borough of Wandsworth, and the smallest was Farleigh (80) that was transferred out of London in 1969 and is now part of the parish of Chelsham and Farleigh.

Parish	Created	Population (1951)	Area acres (1951)	District or borough (1964)	Borough (1965)	Ref.
Barking	Ancient	78,170	3,877	Barking	Barking, Newham	
Dagenham	Ancient	114,568	6,554	Dagenham	Barking, Redbridge	
Arkley	1894	7,536	830	Barnet	Barnet	
Barnet Vale	1894	4,675	279	East Barnet	Barnet	
Chipping Barnet	Ancient	7,062	380	Barnet	Barnet	
East Barnet	Ancient	31,672	1,697	East Barnet	Barnet	
Finchley	Ancient	69,991	3,477	Finchley	Barnet	
Friern Barnet	Ancient	29,163	1,340	Friern Barnet	Barnet	
Hadley	1894	362	362	Barnet	Barnet	
Hendon	Ancient	155,857	10,369	Hendon	Barnet	
Monken Hadley	Ancient	4,061	668	East Barnet	Barnet	
Rowley	1935	678	1,176	Barnet	Barnet	
South Mimms Urban	1894	4,881	273	Barnet	Barnet	
Totteridge	Ancient	4,500	1,604	Barnet	Barnet	
Bexley	Ancient	89,550	4,869	Bexley	Bexley	
Chislehurst and Sidcup	1934	83,850	8,959	Chislehurst and Sidcup	Bexley, Bromley	
Crayford	Ancient	27,950	2,544	Crayford	Bexley	
Erith	Ancient	46,270	3,860	Erith	Bexley	
Wembley	Ancient	131,384	6,295	Wembley	Brent	
Willesden	Ancient	179,697	4,634	Willesden	Brent	
Beckenham	Ancient	74,836	5,937	Beckenham	Bromley	
Bromley	Ancient	64,179	6,513	Bromley	Bromley	
Orpington	Ancient	63,364	20,842	Orpington	Bromley	
Penge	Ancient	25,012	770	Penge	Bromley	
Hampstead	Ancient	95,131	2,265	Hampstead	Camden	
Holborn	1930	24,810	406	Holborn	Camden	
St Pancras	Ancient	138,377	2,694	St Pancras	Camden	
City of London	1907	5,104	660	City of London	City of London	
Coulsdon	Ancient	42,753	6,907	Coulsdon and Purley	Croydon	
Croydon	Ancient	249,870	12,672	Croydon	Croydon	
Farleigh	Ancient	80	1,013	Coulsdon and Purley	Croydon	
Sanderstead	Ancient	20,940	3,223	Coulsdon and Purley	Croydon	
Acton	Ancient	67,471	2,320	Acton	Ealing	
Ealing	Ancient	187,323	8,783	Ealing	Ealing	
Norwood	Ancient	55,896	2,608	Southall	Ealing	
Edmonton	Ancient	104,270	3,896	Edmonton	Enfield	
Enfield	Ancient	110,465	12,399	Enfield	Enfield	
Southgate	Ancient	73,377	3,766	Southgate	Enfield	
Greenwich	1930	89,846	3,858	Greenwich	Greenwich	
Woolwich	1930	147,891	8,282	Woolwich	Greenwich, Newham	
Hackney	Ancient	171,342	3,287	Hackney	Hackney	
Shoreditch	Ancient	44,871	658	Shoreditch	Hackney	
Stoke Newington	Ancient	49,136	864	Stoke Newington	Hackney	
Hammersmith	Ancient	119,367	2,287	Hammersmith	Hammersmith	
Fulham	Ancient	122,064	1,706	Fulham	Hammersmith	
Hornsey	Ancient	98,159	2,872	Hornsey	Harringey	
Tottenham	Ancient	126,929	3,012	Tottenham	Harringey	
Wood Green	Ancient	52,228	1,606	Wood Green	Harringey	
Harrow	1934	219,494	12,555	Harrow	Harrow	
Cranham	Ancient	2,836	3,131	Hornchurch	Havering	
Great Warley	Ancient	324	1,979	Hornchurch	Havering	
Havering-atte-Bower	Ancient	5,812	2,092	Romford	Havering	
Hornchurch	Ancient	79,908	6,755	Hornchurch	Havering	
Noak Hill	1895	5,610	1,595	Romford	Havering	
Rainham	Ancient	7,666	3,247	Hornchurch	Havering	
Romford	1900	76,580	5,655	Romford	Havering	
Upminster	Ancient	13,038	3,357	Hornchurch	Havering	
Wennington	Ancient	320	1,299	Hornchurch	Havering	
Harlington	Ancient	15,946	1,848	Hayes and Harlington	Hillingdon	
Hayes	Ancient	49,650	3,311	Hayes and Harlington	Hillingdon	
Ruislip	Ancient	68,288	6,584	Ruislip Northwood	Hillingdon	
Uxbridge	Ancient	55,960	10,239	Uxbridge	Hillingdon	
Yiewsley and West Drayton	1949	20,468	5,276	Yiewsley and West Drayton	Hillingdon	
Chiswick	Ancient	41,207	1,276	Brentford and Chiswick	Hounslow	
East Bedfont	Ancient	8,656	1,868	Feltham	Hounslow	
Feltham	Ancient	23,992	1,695	Feltham	Hounslow	
Hanworth	Ancient	12,213	1,362	Feltham	Hounslow	
Heston and Isleworth	1927	106,847	7,218	Heston and Isleworth	Hounslow	
New Brentford	Ancient	2,219	213	Brentford and Chiswick	Hounslow	
Old Brentford	Ancient	17,602	844	Brentford and Chiswick	Hounslow	
Finsbury	1915	35,370	587	Finsbury	Islington	
Islington	Ancient	235,632	3,092	Islington	Islington	
Chelsea	Ancient	50,957	660	Chelsea	Kensington and Chelsea	
Kensington	Ancient	168,160	2,290	Kensington	Kensington and Chelsea	
Chessington	Ancient	9,194	1,702	Surbiton	Kingston upon Thames	
Coombe	1894	8,504	1,313	Malden and Coombe	Kingston upon Thames	
Hook	Ancient	5,657	511	Surbiton	Kingston upon Thames	
Kingston upon Thames	Ancient	40,172	1,408	Kingston upon Thames	Kingston upon Thames	
Malden	Ancient	14,307	810	Malden and Coombe	Kingston upon Thames	
New Malden	1894	22,755	1,041	Malden and Coombe	Kingston upon Thames	
Surbiton	1894	27,771	1,358	Surbiton	Kingston upon Thames	
Tolworth	1895	18,253	1,138	Surbiton	Kingston upon Thames	
Lambeth	Ancient	230,240	4,083	Lambeth	Lambeth	
Deptford St Paul	Ancient	75,495	1,564	Deptford	Lewisham	
Lewisham	Ancient	227,576	7,016	Lewisham	Lewisham	
Merton	Ancient	39,313	1,762	Merton and Morden	Merton	
Mitcham	Ancient	67,269	2,932	Mitcham	Merton	
Morden	Ancient	35,417	1,475	Merton and Morden	Merton	
Wimbledon	Ancient	58,141	3,212	Wimbledon	Merton	
East Ham	Ancient	120,836	3,324	East Ham	Newham	
West Ham	Ancient	170,993	4,689	West Ham	Newham	
Ilford	Ancient	184,706	8,425	Ilford	Redbridge	
Wanstead	Ancient	23,921	1,678	Wanstead and Woodford	Redbridge	
Woodford	Ancient	37,702	2,164	Wanstead and Woodford	Redbridge	
Barnes	Ancient	17,933	965	Barnes	Richmond upon Thames	
Ham	Ancient	6,029	1,618	Richmond	Richmond upon Thames	
Kew	Ancient	3,202	297	Richmond	Richmond upon Thames	
Mortlake	Ancient	22,634	1,554	Barnes	Richmond upon Thames	
North Sheen	1894	7,429	329	Richmond	Richmond upon Thames	
Petersham	Ancient	1,134	655	Richmond	Richmond upon Thames	
Richmond	Ancient	24,150	1,210	Richmond	Richmond upon Thames	
Twickenham	Ancient	105,663	7,014	Twickenham	Richmond upon Thames	
Bermondsey	Ancient	60,640	1,503	Bermondsey	Southwark	
Camberwell	Ancient	179,777	4,480	Camberwell	Southwark	
Southwark	1930	97,221	1,132	Southwark	Southwark	
Beddington	Ancient	19,338	2,219	Beddington and Wallington	Sutton	
Carshalton	Ancient	62,721	3,346	Carshalton	Sutton	
Sutton and Cheam	1949	80,673	4,338	Sutton and Cheam	Sutton	
Wallington	Ancient	13,419	826	Beddington and Wallington	Sutton	
Bethnal Green	Ancient	58,353	760	Bethnal Green	Tower Hamlets	
Poplar	1907	73,579	2,331	Poplar	Tower Hamlets	
Stepney	1927	98,858	1,766	Stepney	Tower Hamlets	
Cann Hall	1894	14,424	223	Leyton	Waltham Forest	
Chingford	Ancient	48,355	2,868	Chingford	Waltham Forest	
Leyton	Ancient	91,554	2,371	Leyton	Waltham Forest	
Walthamsow	Ancient	121,135	4,342	Walthamstow	Waltham Forest	
Battersea	Ancient	117,140	2,163	Battersea	Wandsworth	
Wandsworth	1904	330,493	9,107	Wandsworth	Wandsworth, Lambeth	
Paddington	Ancient	125,463	1,357	Paddington	Westminster	
St Marylebone	Ancient	75,821	1,473	St Marylebone	Westminster	
Westminster	1922	99,048	2,503	Westminster	Westminster	

== See also ==
- List of civil parishes in the County of London in 1891
- List of civil parishes in the City of London
