= Godstone Rural District =

Former rural district in Surrey, England

Coordinates: 51.25708°N 0.00027°W

- Rural district
- Area
  - 1911: 49,907 acres (202.0 km^{2})
  - 1961: 52,506 acres (212.5 km^{2})
- Population
  - 1901: 18,378
  - 1971: 40,195
- History
  - Created: 28 December 1894
  - Abolished: 31 March 1974
  - Succeeded by: Tandridge
  - HQ: Godstone (1894–1909); Oxted (1909–1974)
- Subdivisions
  - Type: Civil Parishes

Godstone Rural District was a rural district in Surrey, England from 1894 to 1974, covering an area in the south-east of the county.

== Origins ==
The district had its origins in the Godstone Poor Law Union, which had been created in 1835, covering Godstone itself and several surrounding parishes. A workhouse was built on Church Lane in Bletchingley to serve the union, opening in 1839. In 1872 sanitary districts were established, giving public health and local government responsibilities for rural areas to the existing boards of guardians of poor law unions. As there were no urban authorities within the Godstone Poor Law Union, the Godstone Rural Sanitary District covered the same area as the poor law union.

Under the Local Government Act 1894, rural sanitary districts became rural districts from 28 December 1894. The Godstone Rural District Council held its first meeting on 28 December 1894 at the Clayton Arms (later renamed the White Hart) at 71 High Street, Godstone, which had been the meeting place of the board of guardians. Henry Albert Barclay of Underhill in Bletchingley was appointed the first chairman of the council. He was a major in the army and his father was chairman of Barclays Bank.

In 1899 the parish of Caterham was removed from Godstone Rural District to become an urban district. Warlingham was added to the Caterham Urban District in 1929, when it was renamed Caterham and Warlingham Urban District. Woldingham was subsequently transferred to the Caterham and Warlingham Urban District in 1933.

== Parishes ==
Godstone Rural District contained the following civil parishes:

- Addington (1915–1925) 14.6 square kilometres (5.6 sq mi) Transferred from Croydon Rural District when that district was abolished in 1915. Transferred to County Borough of Croydon in 1925.
- Bletchingley
- Burstow (1933–1974) Transferred from Reigate Rural District, except 10 acres of parish which was added to Horley parish instead.
- Caterham (1894–1899) Became Caterham Urban District, then part of Caterham and Warlingham Urban District in 1929.
- Chelsham (1894–1969)
- Chaldon (1933-1974)
- Farleigh (1894–1933) 4.25 square kilometres (1.64 sq mi) Transferred to Coulsdon and Purley Urban District in 1933.
- Chelsham and Farleigh (1969–1974)
- Crowhurst
- Felbridge
- Godstone
- Horne
- Limpsfield
- Lingfield
- Nutfield (1933–1974) Transferred from Reigate Rural District, except 216 acres of parish which was added to Reigate Municipal Borough instead.
- Oxted
- Tandridge
- Tatsfield
- Titsey
- Warlingham (1894–1929) Merged with Caterham Urban District to become new Caterham and Warlingham Urban District in 1929.
- Woldingham (1894–1933) Transferred to Caterham and Warlingham Urban District 1933.

== Premises ==
Until 1909 the council continued to meet at the Clayton Arms in Godstone. In 1909 the council moved its meetings to the Church Room on Church Lane in Oxted. In 1935 the council built itself a new council chamber and offices on Station Road East in Oxted.

== Abolition ==
Godstone Rural District was abolished under the Local Government Act 1972. The area merged with Caterham and Warlingham Urban District to create Tandridge District with effect from 1 April 1974. The new Tandridge District Council continued to use the offices of both its predecessor councils until the late 1980s, when the former Godstone Rural District Council offices were demolished and a new consolidated office built on the site, opening in 1989.
