= Coulsdon and Purley Urban District =

Local government district in Surrey, England

Coordinates: 51.32°N 0.12°W

Coulsdon and Purley
- Urban district
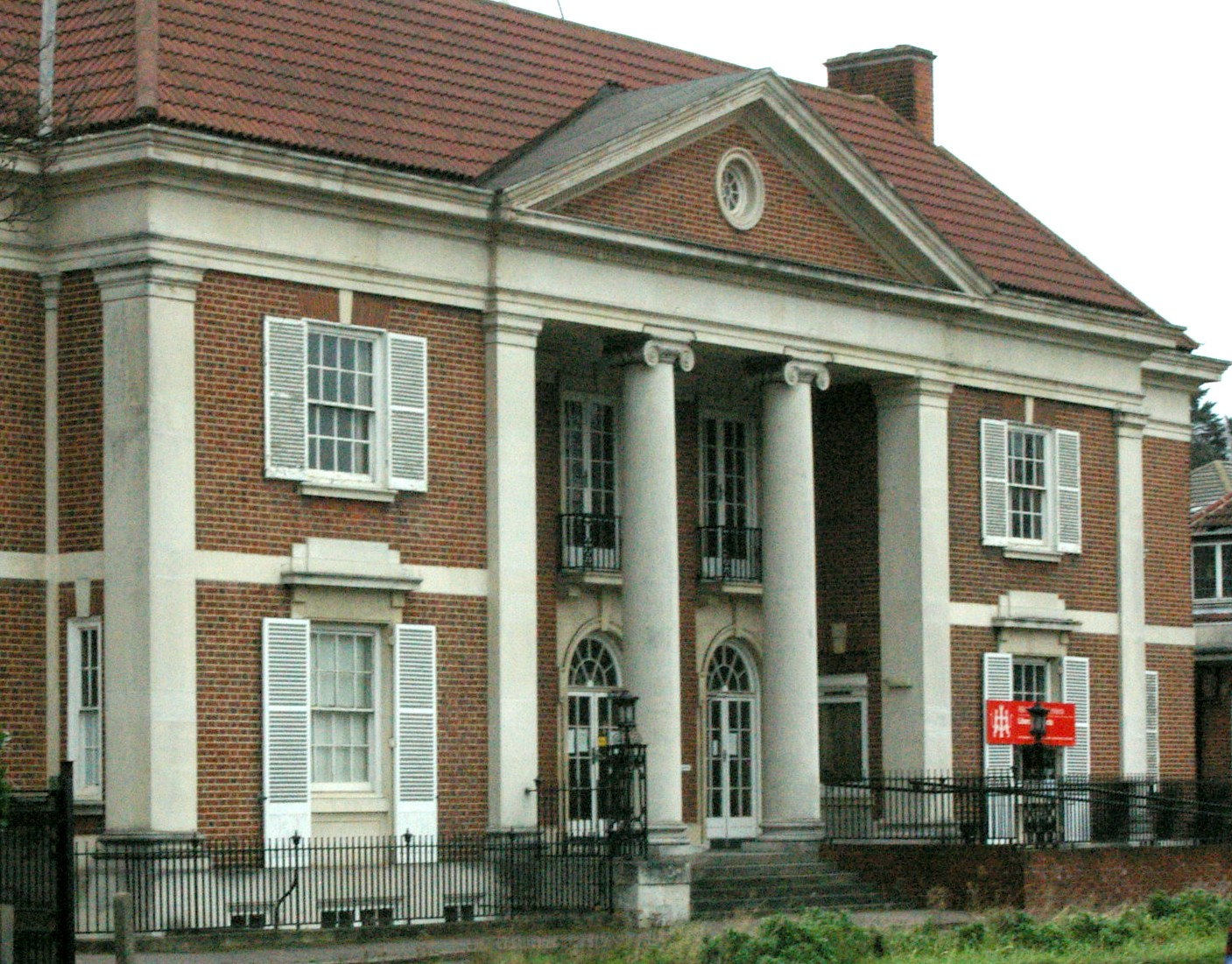
- Purley Council Offices
- Area
  - 1921: 8,572 acres (34.69 km^{2})
  - 1961: 11,143 acres (45.09 km^{2})
- Area transferred
  - 1929: 59 acres from Godstone Rural District
  - 1933: 2,551 acres (net) from adjacent districts
  - 1936: 39 acres (net) to County Borough of Croydon
- Population
  - 1921: 21,491
  - 1961: 74,926
- Density
  - 1921: 2.5/acre
  - 1961: 6.7/acre
- History
  - Created: 1915
  - Abolished: 1965
  - Succeeded by: London Borough of Croydon
- Status: Urban district
- Government: Coulsdon and Purley Urban District Council
  - HQ: Council Offices, Brighton Road, Purley
  - Motto: Animo et Fide (By Courage and Faith)
- Coat of arms

Coulsdon and Purley Urban District was a local government district in northeast Surrey from 1915 to 1965. The local authority was Coulsdon and Purley Urban District Council. The former area of the district is now mostly part of the London Borough of Croydon in Greater London, with parts in the Tandridge District and the Borough of Reigate and Banstead in Surrey.

== Creation ==
The population of Croydon Rural District doubled from 1901 to 1911 as suburban house building took place, with 11,389 in Coulsdon and 2,853 in Sanderstead in 1911. In both cases, the population was much higher than would be typical for rural parishes. Surrey County Council made an order in 1914 to abolish the rural district and this was completed in 1915. The new Coulsdon and Purley Urban District consisted of the parish of Coulsdon, including the settlements of Coulsdon, Kenley and Purley, and the parish of Sanderstead. Coulsdon and Purley Urban District Council replaced Coulsdon Parish Council, Sanderstead Parish Council and Croydon Rural District Council. By 1921 the population was 18,140 in Coulsdon and 3,351 in Sanderstead, and the total population had risen to 21,491.

== Changes ==
On 1 October 1929, 59 acres were gained from Godstone Rural District, transferred from the parish of Warlingham to Sanderstead. The Local Government Act 1929 required county councils to review the districts within their areas. On 1 April 1933 as part of a county review order under the act, the parish of Farleigh was transferred from Godstone Rural District. The boundaries with Beddington and Wallington Urban District, Carshalton Urban District and Caterham and Warlingham Urban District were subject to minor adjustments. 1,421 acres were gained from the abolished Reigate Rural District, consisting of parts of the parishes of Chaldon, Chipstead and Merstham, including the village of Hooley. The boundary with the County Borough of Croydon was adjusted on 1 April 1933 and again on 1 April 1936.

== Governance ==
In 1915 the electoral wards were Coulsdon, Kenley, Purley, Sanderstead and Woodcote.

The electoral wards in 1937 were Coulsdon East, Coulsdon West, Kenley, Purley, Sanderstead, Selsdon and Farleigh, and Woodcote.

The rates charged for the district were one of the lowest in Outer London and below the average for the part of Surrey within the Metropolitan Police District.

== Coat of arms ==
The coat of arms were granted on 14 May 1952. Some charges from these arms were used, together with some charges from the coat of arms of County Borough of Croydon, to form the new coat of arms of the London Borough of Croydon in 1965.

== Abolition ==
The urban district was within the Metropolitan Police District and part of the review area of the Royal Commission on Local Government in Greater London. The commission proposed that it should form part of Greater London, to be combined with Caterham and Warlingham as a new borough. The government broadly accepted the proposal, adding the County Borough of Croydon to the new borough. Caterham and Warlingham Urban District Council requested that their area be excluded from Greater London and this was accepted by the government. Coulsdon and Purley Urban District Council also requested to be excluded, but were turned down. Charles Doughty, MP for Surrey East proposed an amendment to the London Government Bill to exclude Coulsdon and Purley but was defeated. On 1 April 1965 the urban district was abolished and its former area became part of the London Borough of Croydon in Greater London.

== Farleigh and Hooley transfers ==
It was anticipated that the practice of combining whole existing units of local government might provide an unsatisfactory boundary in some places. The London Government Act 1963 Section 6 (4) provided a mechanism for communities on the edge of Greater London to petition for transfer to a neighbouring county. The legislation required the petition to be submitted between 1965 and 1970, to be signed by more than 300 local electors and for the area to be transferred to have no more than 10% of the borough's local electors. Following this procedure, in 1969 Farleigh was transferred back to Surrey to form part of the Chelsham and Farleigh parish in Godstone Rural District and Hooley became part of Banstead Urban District.

== Notable former employee ==
In Peter Cushing's autobiography, (pp.35-37), he wrote that his father secured for him a surveyor's assistant post in the Drawing Department's Surveyor's Office, during the summer of 1933, and that he hated the job, but remained for three years without promotion or advancement due to his lack of ambition in the profession. The only enjoyment he received was drawing perspectives of proposed buildings, which were almost always rejected because they were too imaginative, and expensive and lacked strong foundations, which Cushing disregarded as a "mere detail."
