= Purley, London =

Area of Croydon in London, England

Coordinates: 51.3394°N 0.1128°W

Purley
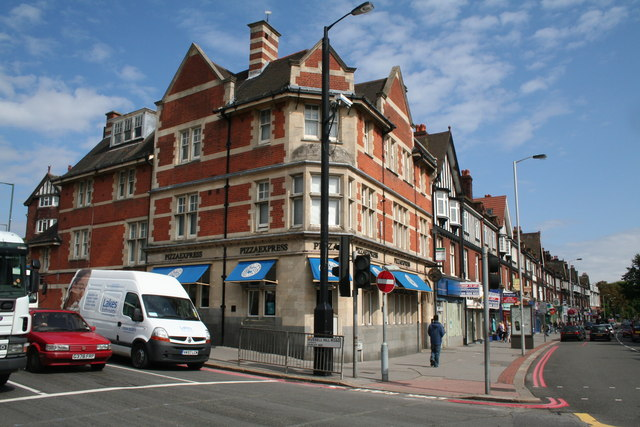
- Street scene in town centre with local Pizza Express branch, formerly the Westminster Bank in the foreground

- Location within Greater London
- OS grid reference: TQ313615
- London borough: Croydon
- Ceremonial county: Greater London
- Region: London
- Country: England
- Sovereign state: United Kingdom
- Post town: PURLEY
- Postcode district: CR8
- Dialling code: 020
- Police: Metropolitan
- Fire: London
- Ambulance: London
- UK Parliament: Croydon South
- London Assembly: Croydon and Sutton

Purley is an area of the London Borough of Croydon in Greater London, England, on the border with Sutton. It is 11.5 miles (18.5 km) south of Charing Cross and 2.5 miles (4.0 km) northeast of the London/Surrey border, with a history going back at least 800 years. It was originally granted as an estate from holdings at Sanderstead and until as a district of Surrey and then, with neighbouring Coulsdon, as an urban district that became an electoral ward of the London Borough of Croydon, becoming part of the ceremonial county of London, in 1965. In 2018 the Purley ward was divided into two: Purley and Woodcote, and Purley Oaks and Riddlesdown.

Purley is a suburban area of South London, and the quintessential suburban environment has been referenced in fictional and popular culture, most notably as the setting for the long running Terry and June sitcom.

Purley had a population of 15,184 in 2022.

== History ==
=== Toponymy ===
The name derives from an estate, mentioned in about 1200 when it was deeded to one William de Pirelea, son of Osbert de Pirelea by the abbot of St. Peter's monastery near Winchester. The original meaning of Purley was probably a wood or clearing where pear trees grow, derived from "Pirlea", which is from Anglo Saxon pir, pear or pirige, pear tree and leá, a clearing or a place.

=== Local government ===
Under the Local Government Act 1894, Purley became part of the Croydon Rural District of Surrey. In 1915 Purley and the neighbouring town of Coulsdon formed the Coulsdon and Purley Urban District which was based at the Purley Council Offices. The council was abolished in 1965, under the London Government Act 1963, and its area transferred to Greater London and used to form part of the London Borough of Croydon.

The urban district council was based in a colonial-style building opened in 1930. The building, on the A23 Brighton Road near Reedham Station, became the property of the London Borough of Croydon and was sold to developers. It was left derelict for many years but was converted into flats in 2012. Plans to dig under the building and build additional flats were refused in 2015.

=== Aviation ===
Kenley Aerodrome, to the south of the town, is currently official property of the Ministry of Defence. It was one of the key fighter stations – together with Croydon Airport and Biggin Hill – during the World War II support of Dunkirk, Battle of Britain and for the defence of London.

=== Suburban growth ===
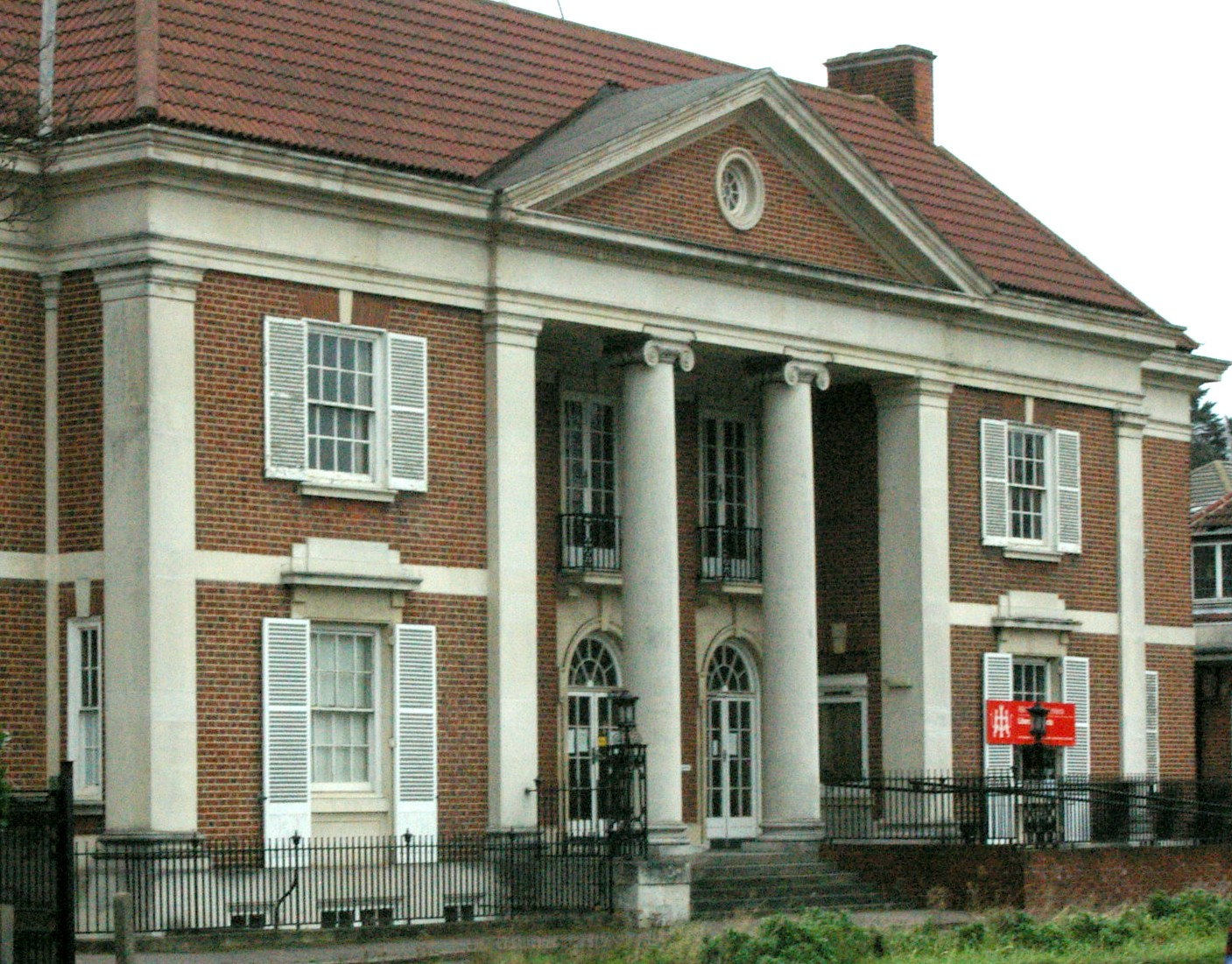
The former Purley Council Offices on Brighton Road, Purley. Now a residential development.

Purley grew rapidly in the 1920s and 1930s, providing spacious homes in a green environment. Northeast Purley stretches into the chalk hill spurs of the North Downs.

One road, Promenade de Verdun, created by William Webb, has a distinction all of its own. It is 600 yards (550 m) long and has on one side Lombardy poplars planted in local soil mixed with French earth specially shipped over to the UK. A plaque at one end of the road explains that the French Ministry of the Interior donated the soil from Armentières, as a memorial to the alliance of World War One and the soldiers who died. At the other end stands an obelisk carved from a single piece of stone with the inscription "Aux soldats de France morts glorieusement pendant la Grande Guerre".

In World War Two, the 32nd Surrey Battalion of the Home Guard was known as the Factory Battalion, and had the specific task of guarding the Purley Way factories: its units were mainly based on staff from the individual firms. The factories adjoining Croydon Airport took the worst of the air raid of 15 August 1940: the British NSF factory was almost entirely destroyed, and the Bourjois factory gutted, with a total of over sixty civilian deaths.

A comprehensive history of Purley and its growth around Caterham Junction (now Purley Station) with the coming of the railways some 150 years ago is found in the Bourne Society's 'Purley Village History' and in its Local History Records publications.

=== Webb Estate ===
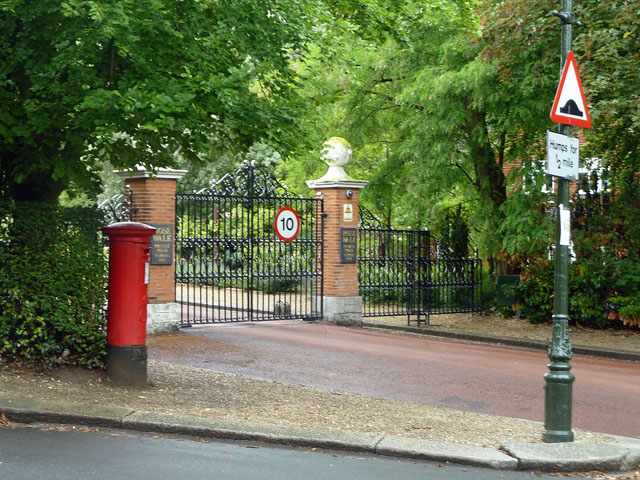
An entrance to the estate

The Webb Estate is a gated community with around 220 homes. It began as 260 acres of farmland before being purchased in the 1880s and transformed into Edwardian homes and landscaped gardens by estate agent William Webb. Webb also had 10 tonnes of battlefield soil shipped from France to construct the listed war memorial at Promenade de Verdun. Known for having a "garden village" feel with a high level of privacy, it also includes two private schools plus a restaurant and deli.

The estate made headlines in a 2002 survey, which found that it had over the years attracted the highest-earning residents in the UK, having established itself as an attractive destination for wealthy city workers.

Notable people to have lived on the Webb Estate include singer Francis Rossi, footballer Wilfried Zaha, television presenter Laura Hamilton, and former Downing Street Press Secretary Bernard Ingham.

== Geography ==
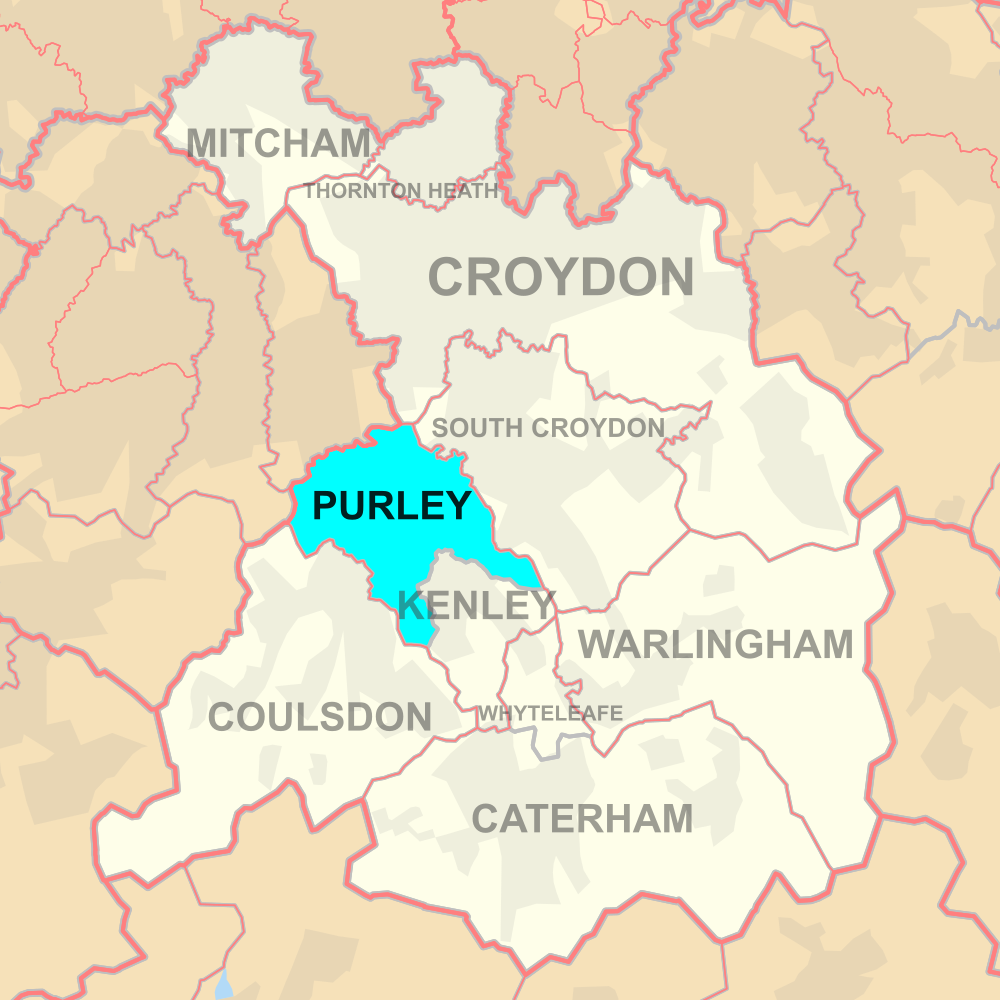
Map of Purley Postal District

The Purley postal district encompasses Purley high street and extends through Woodcote to the West, includes the Peaks Hill area to the North, and borders Purley Oaks in South Croydon. To the East it includes Riddlesdown and to the South it borders Kenley and Coulsdon. The current electoral ward of Purley and Woodcote is largely co-extensive with the postal district, but Riddlesdown is now in the neighbouring Purley Oaks and Riddlesdown ward.

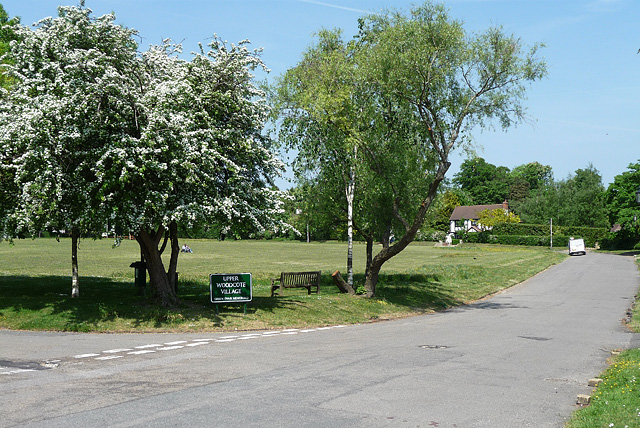
Woodcote Village Green

Woodcote is contained within Purley. Developed in the early 20th century, it is centred on Woodcote Village Green and is the location of Woodcote Model Village. Purley's Webb Estate lies on Woodcote road, close to Upper Woodcote Village.

The Bourne river runs through Purley. The river is culverted but can flood in Purley valley. A local history society take their name from this river.

== Education ==
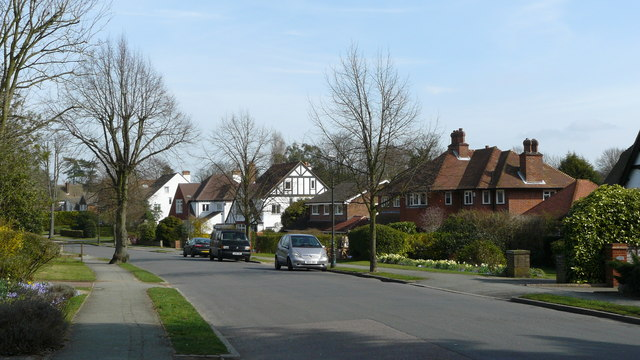
Peaks Hill

Purley is home to a number of schools; including four Catholic schools. Two of which are in Peaks Hill neighbourhood of Purley, and these are The John Fisher School an all boys' state school (formerly an independent and then a voluntary aided state school), and Laleham Lea School a co-educational prep-school.

Purley has one of the UK's longest-established language schools, Purley Language College, founded in 1928.

Some of the current schools in Purley are:

Current Purley Schools
| Name | URN | Ofsted Rating | Type | Mix | Status | Open Date | Student Capacity |
|---|---|---|---|---|---|---|---|
| Beaumont Primary School | 101756 | Outstanding, 2025 | Primary | Mixed | LEA | | 222 |
| Christ Church C of E Primary School | 101793 | Good, 2022 | Primary | Mixed | C of E | | 420 |
| Cumnor House School for Girls | 136226 | | Primary | Girls | Independent | 8 September 2010 | 181 |
| Laleham Lea School | 101834 | | Primary | Mixed | Catholic Independent | 1 January 1977 | 172 |
| Margaret Roper Catholic Primary School | 101797 | Good, 2023 | Primary | Mixed | Catholic | | 226 |
| Riddlesdown Collegiate | 138178 | Outstanding, 2023 | Secondary | Mixed | LEA | January 1958 | 2,040 |
| St David's School | 101839 | | Primary/Prep | Mixed | Independent | 23 October 1957 | 172 |
| St Nicholas School | 101854 | Requires Improvement, 2024 | Primary | Mixed | LEA/Special | | 265 |
| The John Fisher School | 103009 | Good, 2023 | Secondary | Boys | Catholic | 1929 | 1,190 |
| Thomas More Catholic School | 101821 | Good, 2024 | Secondary | Mixed | Catholic | 24 September 1962 | 850 |
| Tudor Lodge School | 131829 | | Mixed | Mixed | Independent | 3 June 1999 | 8 |

== Retail and commerce ==
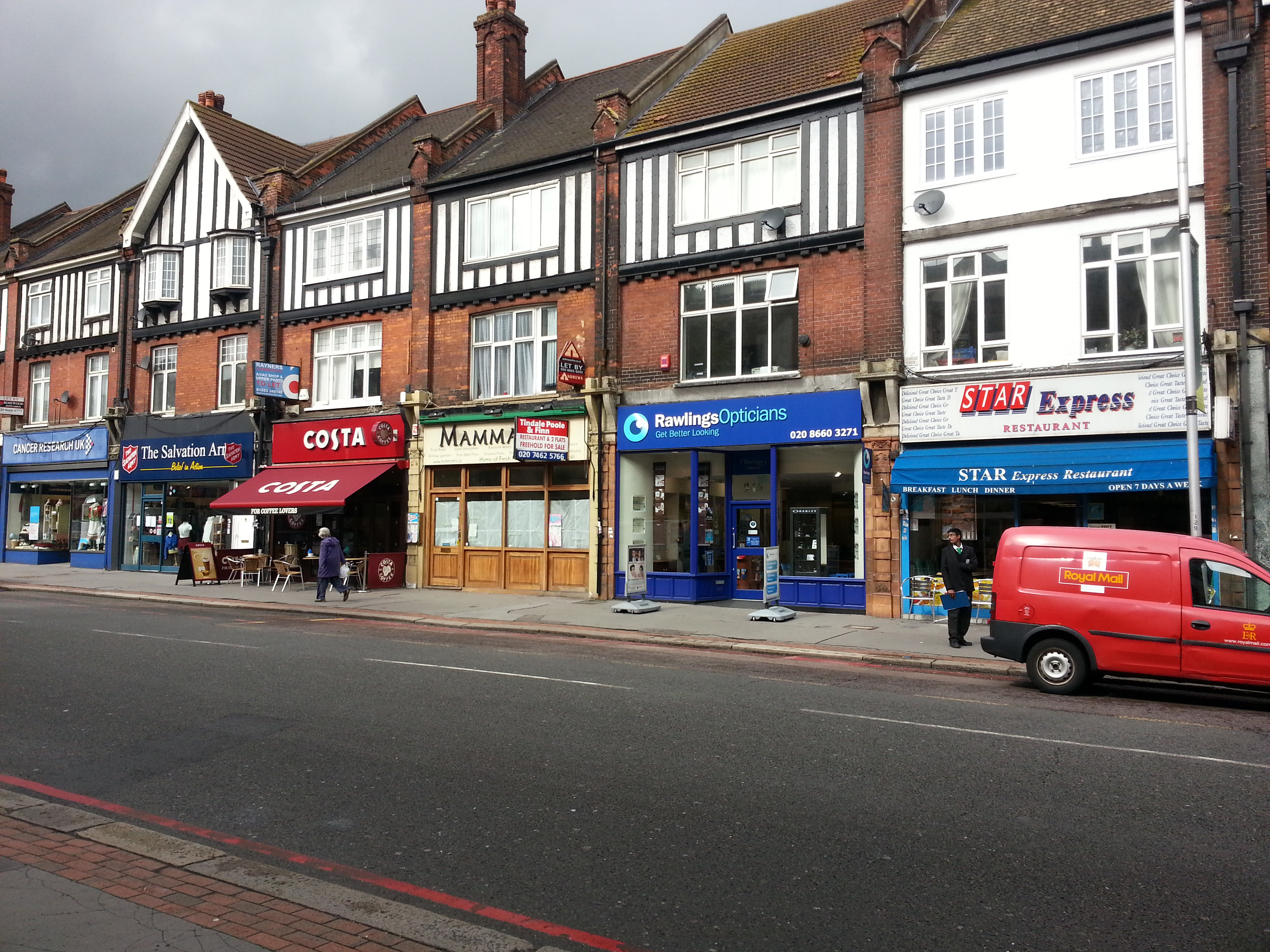
Shops in Purley

Purley used to have many different kinds of shops such as greengrocers, butchers, toy shops, tobacconists, a restaurant and a cinema. There was an earlier Sainsbury's store that closed in the 1980s, when a new Sainsbury's was opened at Purley Fountain. The new Sainsbury's closed in 2001. A Tesco superstore was opened in 1991, and there has been a shift in the town's retail offering towards charity shops, restaurants and non retail businesses.

Purley retail and commerce interests are represented by the Purley Business improvement district. This Business Improvement District (BID) is in the second 5-year term having successfully been voted in favour in 2015 and 2020.

The island opposite Purley Baptist Church has been refurbished and the Church, under the banner of 58:12 (a company and charity set up by the Church) are planning to redevelop it. Other partners in the development of a strategy for the regeneration of central Purley include the Purely Business improvement district, the Purley & Woodcote Residents' Association and Purley Rotary who actively participate in the Neighbourhood Partnership forums hosted by Croydon Council.

== Demography ==
As of 2022, the largest ethnic group in Purley & Woodcote was ‘White’, constituting 56.97% of the total population. The ‘Asian’ ethnic group was second largest, making up 20.13%, while ‘Black, Caribbean or African’ accounted for 11.73% of the population. Mixed/multiple ethnicities made up 7.5%. 'Other ethnic groups' account for 3% of the population. The smallest ethnic group was 'Arab', making up only 0.6% of the wards population.

71.4% of the wards population were born in the UK. The remaining 28.6% were from overseas, with the largest amount being listed as from 'The Middle East & Asia'.

The largest religion was listed as Christianity, at 51.3%. The second largest religion was Islam, at 9.5%. Third was Hinduism, at 8.2%. Following that were Sikhism at 1%, Buddhism at 0.9%, Judaism at 0.2% and 'Other Religion' at 0.8%. As well as this, 'No Religion' accounted for 28% of the population.

== Politics ==
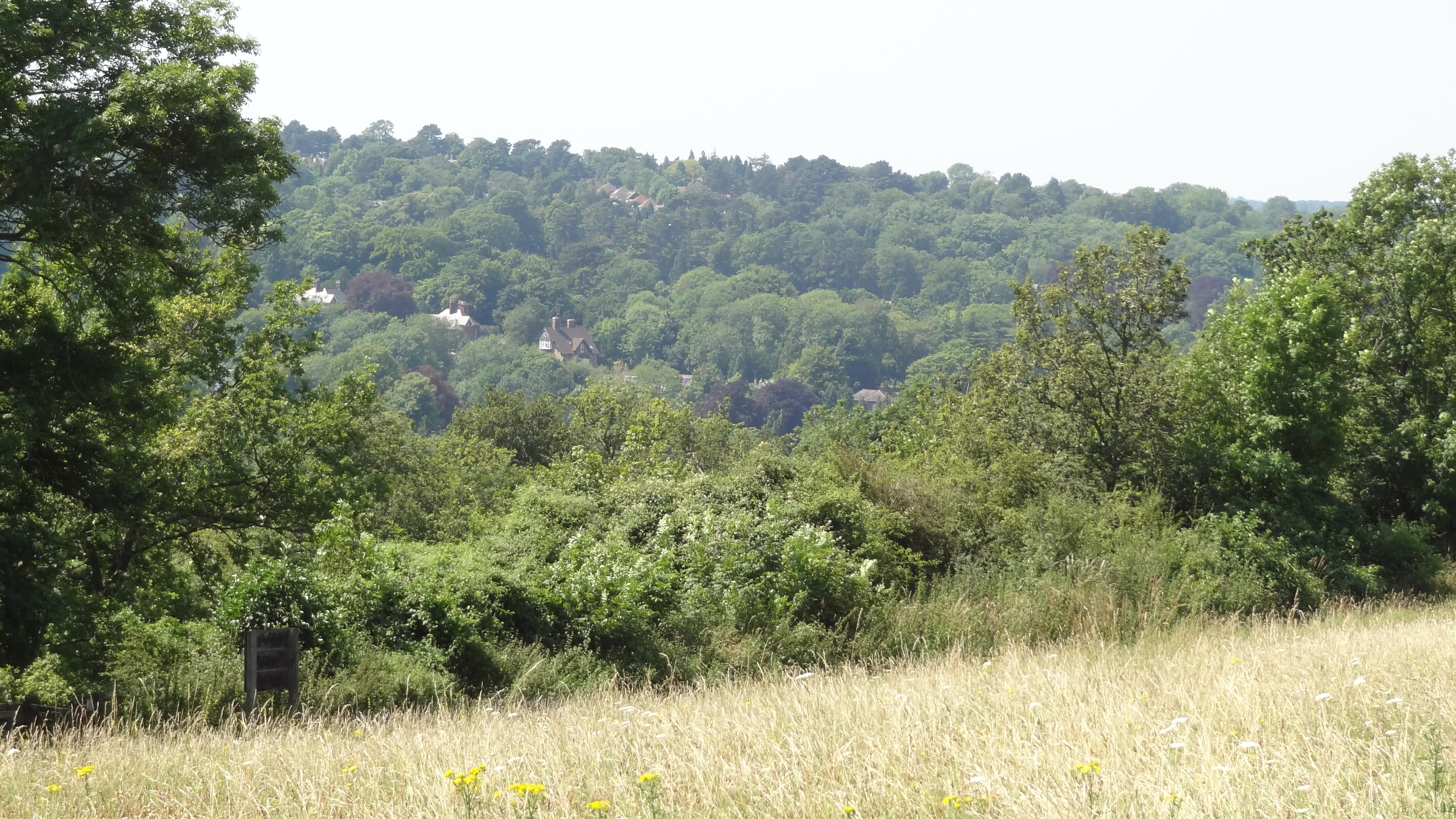
Riddlesdown

Purley lies within the Croydon South parliamentary constituency, where voters have consistently returned Conservative Party MPs to the local seat since 1974. Purley has been staunchly conservative and its amalgamation into the London borough of Croydon in 1965 helped consolidate the middle class domination of that borough. The Purley electoral ward returned Conservative party councillors in Croydon London Borough Council elections from 1965 up until the reorganisation of 2018. In 2018, Purley was split into two wards; Purley and Woodcote, and Purley Oaks and Riddlesdown.

== Sport and leisure ==
There are a number of football clubs in the area.

Purley John Fisher Rugby Football Club is based in Old Coulsdon.

Purley Cricket Club is part of Purley Sports Club. Purley Sports Club also provides tennis, squash, padel and netball.

There are a number of field hockey clubs based in and around Purley that are part of the South East Hockey and the London Hockey league structures. Current hockey clubs in and around the area are Kenley, Purley, Purley Walcountians and Sanderstead.

== Fictional references ==
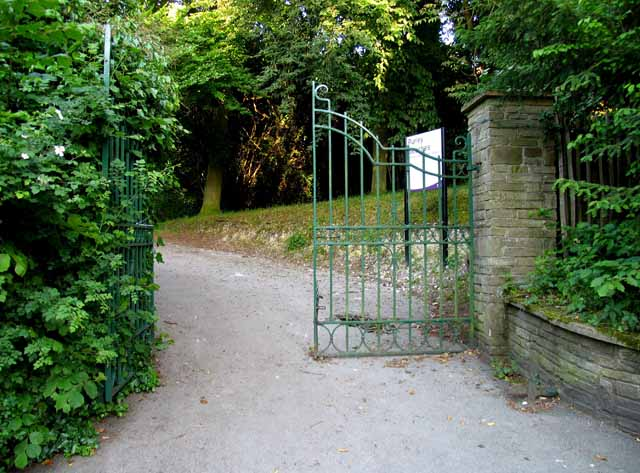
Entrance to Purley Beeches

- On television the town became known in the sitcom Terry and June, in which Terry and June Medford (Terry Scott and June Whitfield), had moved after the characters' previous series, Happy Ever After. The sitcom was set on the cusp of Purley and Wallington (on Church Road in a house within sight of St Mark's Church) and the opening credits featured them searching for each other around the, then open air, Whitgift Centre – a shopping centre in Croydon.
- One of the houses used in Footballers' Wives is 7 Rose Walk, Purley, owned by former Crystal Palace FC Chairman Ron Noades.
- The CBBC children's sitcom Little Howard's Big Question is based in Purley, and also features continuous references to Croydon.
- Mr Angry, a character on Steve Wright's Radio 1 afternoon show in the 1980s, is from Purley.

== Notable residents ==
- Michael Arthur, Vice-Chancellor of Leeds University, Provost of University College London from September 2013, was born in Purley.
- Jay Aston, singer with Bucks Fizz, was born in Purley.
- Ronald Binge and his wife Vera lived at 18, Smitham Bottom Lane in the 1950s. He composed the well-known Elizabethan Serenade there.
- Derren Brown, magician and mentalist, was born and grew up in Purley.
- Kit Connor, actor, was raised in Purley.
- Peter Cushing, actor, was born in nearby Kenley, and went to school in Purley.
- Brian Fahey, composer of "At the Sign of the Swingin' Cymbal" (the signature tune to BBC Radio's Pick of the Pops).
- Andy Frampton, former professional footballer, grew up in Purley.
- Shelagh Fraser, actress, was born in Purley
- Laura Hamilton, TV presenter and Dancing on Ice Contestant, lives in Purley.
- Nigel Harman, actor, was born in Purley.
- Sir Bernard Ingham, Margaret Thatcher's former press secretary, lived in Purley.
- Sir David P. Lane, oncologist best known for identifying P53, went to John Fisher school in Purley.
- Martin Lee, singer with Brotherhood of Man, was born in Purley.
- Archibald Low, pioneer of radio guidance systems, was born in Purley.
- Ray Mears, TV survivalist, went to school in Purley.
- Ron Noades, former chairman of Wimbledon FC, Crystal Palace FC and Brentford FC and owner of the Altonwood Golf Group, lived in Rose Walk, Purley, from 1993 until 2013.
- Harold Palmer (hermit), was born in Purley in 1931.
- Innes Hope Pearse, doctor and co-founder of the Peckham Experiment, grew up in Purley.
- Francis Rossi, lead singer of Status Quo, lives in the Webb Estate in Purley.
- John Horne Tooke, an English politician and philologist, lived in Purley at the end of the 18th century where he began writing Epea Pteroenta, Or, The Diversions of Purley.
- Wilfried Zaha, footballer, Crystal Palace FC, lives in the Webb Estate.

== Transport ==
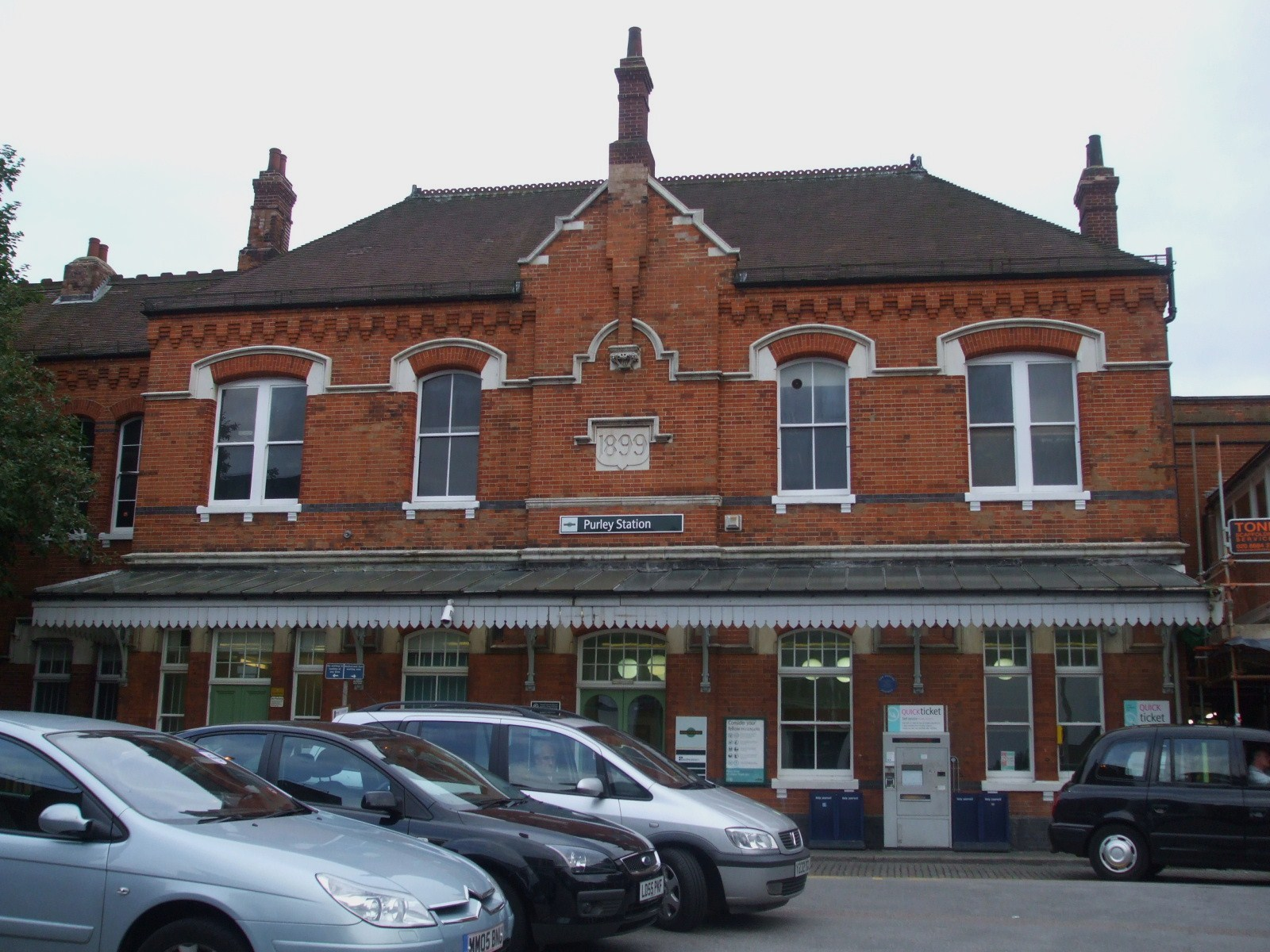
Purley railway station

Purley Cross gyratory connects routes leading south-east to East Grinstead and Eastbourne (the A22), west to Epsom and Kingston (the A2022), south to Redhill and Brighton (the A23), and north to Croydon and Central London (the A23 and A235). The A23 north from Purley forms the Purley Way, which leads to Croydon's trading and industrial hinterland and also to the former Croydon Airport, the predecessor of the present London Heathrow Airport and London Gatwick Airport.

The town is on the main London-to-Brighton railway line and is served by Purley and Purley Oaks stations on that line, and Reedham station on the Tattenham Corner Line.

=== Nearest railway stations ===
- Purley railway station
- Purley Oaks railway station
- Riddlesdown railway station
- Reedham railway station
- Sanderstead railway station

=== Nearest places ===
- Beddington
- Caterham
- Coulsdon
- Wallington
- Kenley
- Riddlesdown
- Sanderstead
- Selsdon
- South Croydon
- Waddon

== See also ==
- The John Fisher School
- Commonweal Lodge
