= Purley Council Offices =

Municipal building in London, England

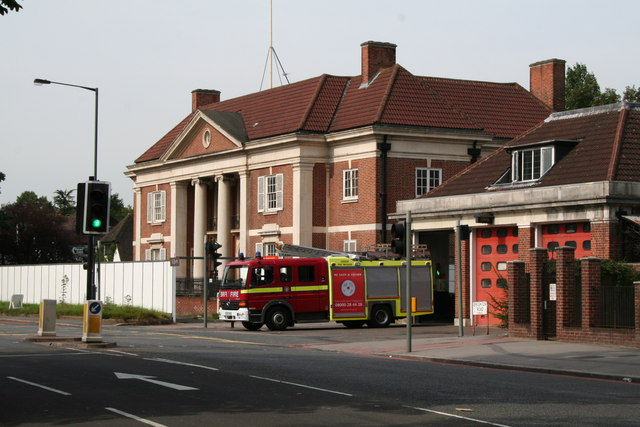
- Purley Council offices

- Shown in Croydon
- 51.3315°N 0.1252°W
- Location: Brighton Road, Purley

History
- Built: 1930

Site notes
- Architect(s): W. B. Nicholls and Basil Hughes
- Architectural style: Neo-Georgian style

Listed Building – Grade II
- Official name: Purley Council Offices including attached railings
- Designated: 21 March 2002
- Reference no.: 1063902

Purley Council Offices, also known as Purley Town Hall, is a former municipal building in Brighton Road, Purley, London. The structure, which was the headquarters of Coulsdon and Purley Urban District Council, is a Grade II listed building.

== History ==
Following significant population growth, largely associated with the increasing number of commuter homes in the area, the villages of Coulsdon, Purley and Sanderstead were brought together as an urban district within the historic county of Surrey in 1915. In the 1920s the new civic leaders decided to procure council offices for the area: the site chosen was open land on the north side of Brighton Road. The new building was the subject of a design competition which was assessed by Philip Hepworth and won by W. B. Nicholls and Basil Hughes.

The new building was designed in the Neo-Georgian style, built in red brick with stone dressings at a cost of £30,000 and was officially opened by the Lord Mayor of London, Sir William Neal, on 8 November 1930. The design involved a symmetrical main frontage with seven bays facing onto Brighton Road with the end bays slightly set back; the central section of three bays, which slightly projected forward, featured a full-height tetrastyle portico with two Ionic order columns flanked by two Doric order pilasters supporting an entablature and a modillioned pediment containing an oculus in the tympanum. There were three recessed round headed doorways on the ground floor and three recessed French doors with iron balconies on the first floor. The side bays contained sash windows on both floors and the end bays contained sash windows on the ground floor and casement windows on the first floor. Internally, the principal rooms were the council chamber, which featured a barrel vaulted ceiling, and the two committee rooms. An extension to the rear was completed in May 1937.

The building continued to serve as the headquarters of the urban district council for much of the 20th century but ceased to serve as the local of seat of government when the enlarged London Borough of Croydon was formed in 1965. It subsequently served as a venue for community events before being sold to a developer in 2002; it then remained derelict for a decade before being converted into twenty-three apartments in 2012. A scheme submitted by the developer seeking to undertake underground excavation to create an extra eight apartments was refused by the council in July 2015.
