= Harold Palmer (hermit) =

British hermit (died October 4, 2024)

Harold Palmer, known as Brother Harold, (born Richard Harold Palmer; c. 1 May 1931 – 4 October 2024) was a British Christian hermit.

Palmer was born in Purley, South London, around 1 May 1931, the eldest son of the proprietor of Propert's polishing company.He lived in solitude for over fifty years at Shepherds Law in Northumberland. He integrated Anglican, Catholic, and Orthodox liturgical traditions and founded a hermitage that became a pilgrimage destination and example of ecumenical contemplative life.
