= Thomas More Catholic School, Purley =

Thomas More Catholic School

Location
- Russell Hill Road; Purley, Greater London, CR8 2XP; England; 51°20′37″N 0°07′12″W

Information
- Type: Voluntary aided
- Religious affiliation: Roman Catholic
- Established: 1962
- Local authority: Croydon
- Department for Education URN: 101821 Tables
- Ofsted: Reports
- Head Teacher: Maryssa Dako
- Gender: Coeducational
- Age: 11 to 18
- Enrolment: 705 as of January 2023
- Houses: Mark, Matthew, Luke, Mary and John
- Colours: Years 7–10: Bottle Green Year 11: Black and Green
- Website: http://www.tmore.org.uk/

Thomas More Catholic School is a Roman Catholic secondary school and sixth form, located in the Purley area of the London Borough of Croydon, England. The Margaret Roper Primary School is located adjacent to Thomas More Catholic School.

The school was established in 1962 in buildings formerly used as an orphanage. It is a voluntary aided school, under the direction of the Roman Catholic Archdiocese of Southwark and Croydon London Borough Council. The school has also been awarded the International School Award, since 2008.

Thomas More Catholic School offers GCSEs and BTECs as programmes of study for pupils, whilst sixth form students can choose to study from a range of A Levels and BTEC Nationals.
