= Chelsham and Farleigh =

Civil parish in Surrey, England

Coordinates: 51.317°N 0.032°W

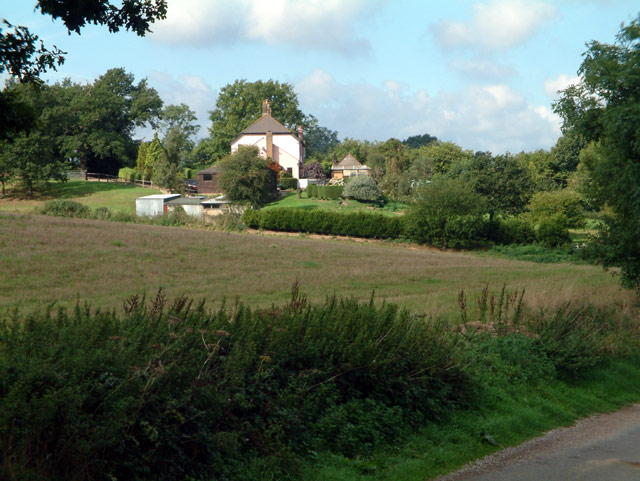
- Fields, home and woods in Washpond Lane, Chelsham

- Location within Surrey
- Area: 14.91 sq mi (38.6 km^{2})
- Population: 865 (Civil Parish)
  - Density: 58/sq mi (22/km^{2})
- OS grid reference: TQ372602
  - London: 14 mi (23 km) NNW
- Civil parish: Chelsham and Farleigh
- District: Tandridge
- Shire county: Surrey
- Region: South East
- Country: England
- Sovereign state: United Kingdom
- Post town: WARLINGHAM
- Postcode district: CR6
- Dialling code: 01883
- Police: Surrey
- Fire: Surrey
- Ambulance: South East Coast
- UK Parliament: East Surrey
- Website: Chelsham and Farleigh Parish Council

Chelsham and Farleigh is a civil parish in the Tandridge District of Surrey, England. The parish is high on the North Downs and centred 14 miles (23 km) south-southeast of central London and it adjoins the Greater London boundary; it is a predominantly rural/wooded parish aside from minority of land used for homes and gardens. Other than the villages of Chelsham and Farleigh, the parish also includes the hamlet of Fickleshole. The parish was created on 1 April 1969 as an amalgamation of its two named small villages.

== History ==
Farleigh was an ancient parish and Chelsham was a chapelry of the parish of Warlingham, both within the Tandridge Hundred of Surrey. Both became civil parishes in the Godstone poor law union, and were part of the Godstone registration and rural sanitary district.

When the Godstone Rural District was created in 1894 it included the parishes of Chelsham and Farleigh, each with a parish council. In 1933 as part of a county review order, Farleigh parish was transferred to Coulsdon and Purley Urban District and the parish council was abolished. As part of the review 653 acres (2.64 km^{2}) of Chelsham parish was transferred to Caterham and Warlingham Urban District. 38 acres (0.15 km^{2}) of Farleigh parish was transferred to the County Borough of Croydon in 1936.

In 1965 Coulsdon and Purley Urban District was abolished and Farleigh became part of the London Borough of Croydon in Greater London. However, some adjustments were made to the Greater London boundary and the civil parish of Chelsham and Farleigh was created on 1 April 1969. It was formed as a parish in Godstone Rural District, as an amalgamation of the parish of Chelsham with the former parish of Farleigh. Chelsham parish was 2,703 acres (10.94 km^{2}) in 1961 and Farleigh was 1,013 acres (4.10 km^{2}) in 1951. Godstone Rural District was abolished on 1 April 1974 and the civil parish became part of the Tandridge District.

== Government ==
Chelsham and Farleigh Parish Council is the local council for the parish. The council meets at Farleigh Hall, in Farleigh. The parish has seven councillors. It is divided into the two wards of Chelsham and Farleigh. Chelsham ward elects five councillors and Farleigh ward has two councillors. The parish clerk is M S Turner. For elections to the Surrey County Council the parish is part of the Warlingham electoral division, electing one county councillor. For elections to the Tandridge District Council the parish is part of the Warlingham East and Chelsham and Farleigh ward, electing three district councillors.

== Geography ==
The civil parish is 1,491 hectares (5.76 sq mi). It is located approximately 14 miles (23 km) south-southeast of central London and is adjacent to the Greater London boundary in the northwest, north and east. It is predominantly rural open land in the Metropolitan Green Belt. The parish includes the settlements of Chelsham, Farleigh and Fickleshole. The boundaries abut the built-up areas of New Addington and Selsdon to the north, Warlingham and Woldingham to the west, and Biggin Hill to the east. Postal addresses in the parish fall under the CR6 postcode district of the Warlingham post town.

== Demography and housing ==
2011 Census Homes
Output area	Detached	Semi-detached	Terraced	Flats and apartments	Caravans/temporary/mobile homes	shared between households
(Civil Parish)	122	79	66	38	4	0

The average level of accommodation in the region composed of detached houses was 28%, the average that was apartments was 22.6%.

2011 Census Key Statistics
Output area	Population	Households	% Owned outright	% Owned with a loan	hectares
(Civil Parish)	865	309	37.2%	38.5%	1491

The proportion of households in the civil parish who owned their home outright compares to the regional average of 35.1%. The proportion who owned their home with a loan compares to the regional average of 32.5%. The remainder lived in rented dwellings (plus a negligible percentage of households living rent-free).
