= List of civil parishes in the City of London =

This is a list of the former civil parishes in the ceremonial county of the City of London.

Since 1965 there have been no civil parishes in the City of London and it is therefore unparished. Although civil parishes have been permitted in London boroughs since 2007, they cannot be created in the City of London.

The City of London formed a single civil parish from 1907, until it was abolished on 1 April 1965.

== List of parishes prior to 1907 ==
The parishes abolished in 1907 (with the exception of the Inner and Middle Temples) were as follows (other parishes that existed previously but were amalgamated are noted):

- Allhallows Barking
- Allhallows Bread Street
- Allhallows Honey Lane
- Allhallows Lombard Street
- Allhallows London Wall
  - Absorbed St Augustine on the Wall 1441
- Allhallows Staining
- Allhallows the Great
- Allhallows the Less
- Barnards Inn
  - Extra-parochial place, civil parish from 1858.
- Bridewell Precinct (Note: Parishes outside the walls)
  - Extra-parochial place, civil parish from 1858.
- Christchurch Newgate Street
  - Formed 1547 by union of abolished parishes St Audoen, St Nicholas Shambles
- Clement's Inn
  - Still extra-parochial in 1907.
- Clifford's Inn
  - Still extra-parochial in 1907.
- Holy Trinity the Less
- Inner Temple
  - Extra-parochial place. Still extant in 1907.
- Middle Temple
  - Extra-parochial place. Still extant in 1907.
- New Inn
  - Still extra-parochial in 1907.
- St Alban Wood Street
- St Alphage Sion College (also known St Alphage London Wall)
- St Andrew by the Wardrobe
- St Andrew Holborn Below the Bars
  - Created 1723 from the part of the parish of St Andrew Holborn within the city. (remainder, in Middlesex became St Andrew Holborn Above Bars)
- St Andrew Hubbard (also known as St Andrew Budge Row)
- St Andrew Undershaft
  - Absorbed parish of St Mary Axe in 1562
- St Anne and St Agnes Aldersgate
- St Anne Blackfriars
- St Antholin
- St Augustine (also known as St Augustine Watling Street)
- St Bartholomew by the Royal Exchange
- St Bartholomew the Great (also known as St Bartholomew West Smithfield)
  - Parish formed 1544, previously extra-parochial precinct of Priory.
- St Bartholomew the Less
  - Parish formed 1547, previously extra-parochial area occupied by St Bartholomew's Hospital
- St Benet Fink
- St Benet Gracechurch
- St Benet Paul's Wharf
- St Benet Sherehog
- St Botolph by Billingsgate
- St Botolph Without Aldersgate
  - Included Liberty of Glasshouse Yard in Middlesex until 1899
- St Botolph Without Aldgate
- St Botolph Without Bishopsgate
- St Bride
- St Christopher le Stocks
- St Clement Eastcheap
- St Dionis Backchurch
- St Dunstan in the East
- St Dunstan in the West
  - Included the Liberty of the Rolls in Middlesex until 1866
- St Edmund the King and Martyr
- St Ethelburga (also known as St Ethelburga Bishopsgate)
- St Faith under St Paul's
- St Gabriel Fenchurch Street
  - Originally All Hallows Fenchurch
- St George Botolph Lane
- St Giles Without Cripplegate
  - Included an area in Middlesex until 1723 when it was constituted as separate parish of St Luke's
- St Gregory by St Paul
- St Helen Bishopsgate
- St James Duke's Place
  - Formed 1622/23 from part of St Katherine Cree
- St James Garlickhithe
- St John the Baptist upon Walbrook
- St John the Evangelist Friday Street
  - Originally St Werburga
- St John Zachary
- St Katherine Coleman
  - Originally All Hallows Coleman
- St Katherine Cree
- St Lawrence Jewry
- St Lawrence Pountney
- St Leonard Eastcheap
- St Leonard Foster Lane
- St Magnus the Martyr
- St Margaret Lothbury
- St Margaret Moses
- St Margaret New Fish Street
- St Margaret Pattens
- St Martin Ludgate
- St Martin Orgar
- St Martin Outwich
- St Martin Pomeroy
- St Martin Vintry
- St Mary Abchurch
- St Mary Aldermanbury
- St Mary Aldermary
- St Mary at Hill
- St Mary Axe
  - Absorbed by St Andrew Undershaft 1562
- St Mary Bothaw
- St Mary Colechurch
- St Mary le Bow
- St Mary Magdalene Milk Street
- St Mary Magdalene Old Fish Street
- St Mary Mounthaw
- St Mary Somerset
- St Mary Staining
- St Mary Woolchurch Haw
- St Mary Woolnoth
- St Matthew Friday Street
- St Michael Bassishaw
- St Michael Cornhill
- St Michael Crooked Lane
- St Michael le Querne
- St Michael Paternoster Royal
- St Michael Queenhithe
- St Michael Wood Street
- St Mildred Bread Street
- St Mildred Poultry
- St Nicholas Acons
- St Nicholas Cole Abbey
- St Nicholas Olave
  - Formed in 1271 by the union of St Nicholas Bread Street and St Olave Bread Street
- St Nicholas Shambles
  - Formed part of new parish of Christchurch Newgate Street 1547
- St Olave Hart Street
- St Olave Old Jewry
- St Olave Silver Street
- St Pancras Soper Lane
- St Peter Cornhill
- St Peter le Poer
- St Peter Paul's Wharf
- St Peter Westcheap
- St Sepulchre Without Newgate
- St Stephen Coleman Street
- St Stephen Walbrook
- St Swithin London Stone
- St Thomas Apostle
- St Vedast Foster Lane
- Serjeants' Inn Fleet Street
  - Extra-parochial place, civil parish from 1858.
- Thavies Inn
  - Extra-parochial place, civil parish from 1858.
- Whitefriars Precinct
  - Extra-parochial place, civil parish from 1858.

== Map ==
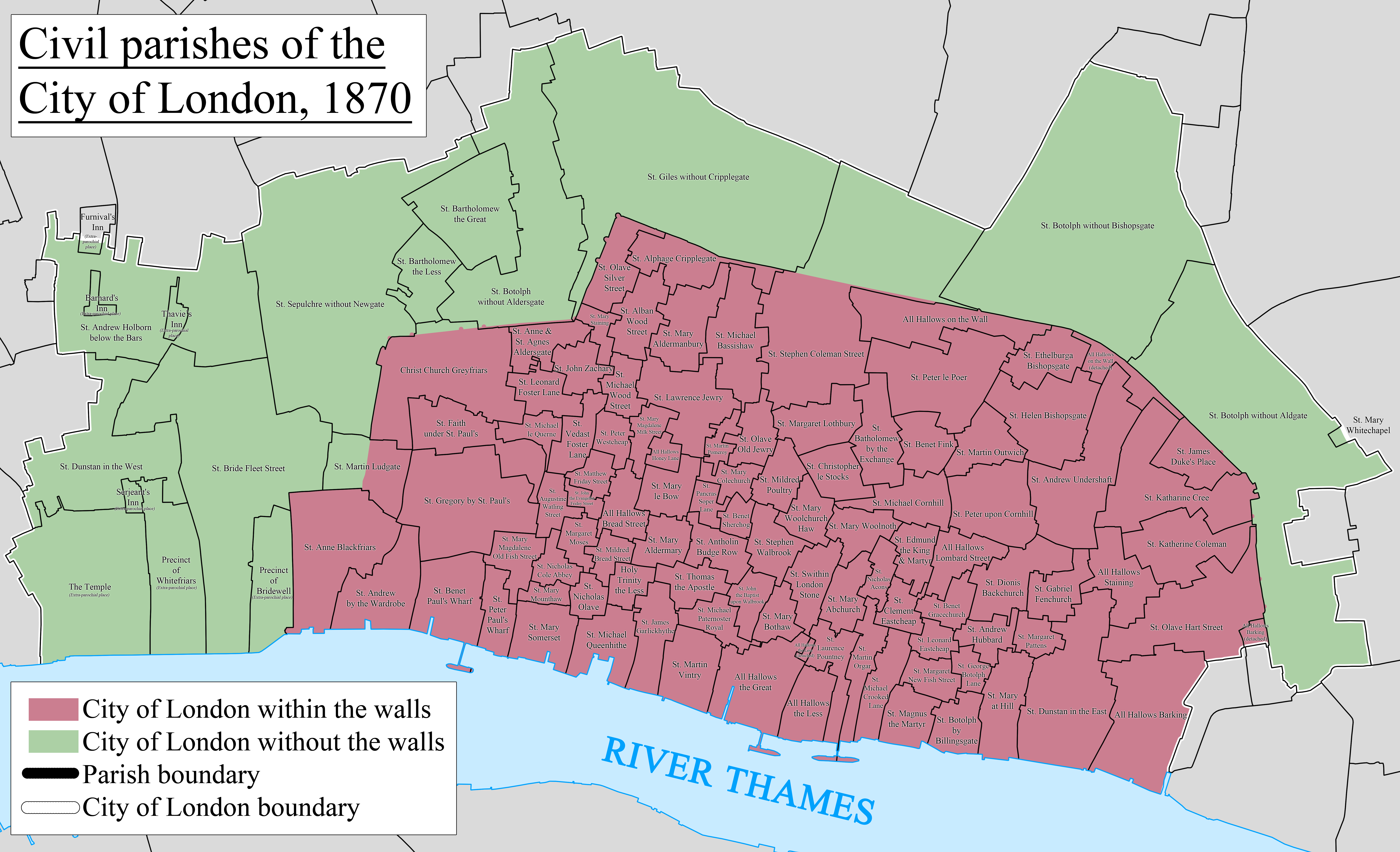
A map showing the civil parish borders as they were in 1870.

== Southwark ==
During the period the Borough of Southwark was considered to be part of the City of London it included the parishes of St George, St Olave, St Saviour and St Thomas.

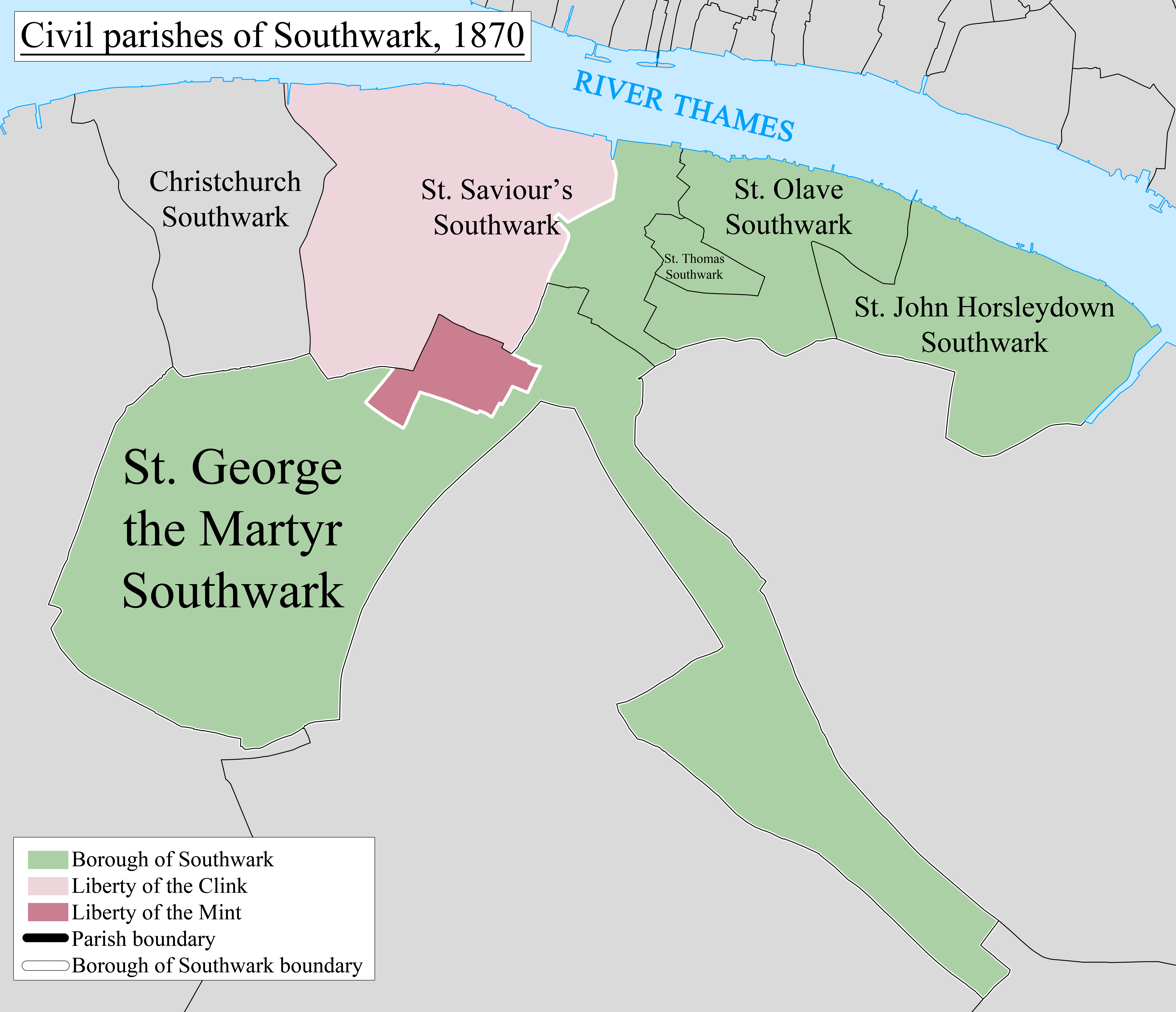

== Bills of mortality ==
All the parishes in the City of London were included in the regular weekly bills of mortality that commenced in 1603, except St James Duke's Place which was added in 1626.

== See also ==
- List of churches in the City of London
- Wards of the City of London
- List of civil parishes in Greater London
