= Chertsey Rural District =

Former rural district in Surrey, England

Chertsey
- Area
  - 1901: 16,020 acres (64.8 km^{2})
- Population
  - 1901: 6,657
  - 1911: 13,375
- History
  - Origin: Sanitary district
  - Created: 1894
  - Abolished: 1933
- Status: Rural district
- Government: Chertsey Rural District Council
  - HQ: Council Offices, West Byfleet
- Subdivisions
  - Type: Civil parishes

Chertsey Rural District was a rural district in Surrey, England, from 1894 to 1933.

The rural district was the successor to the Chertsey Rural Sanitary District and originally comprised seven civil parishes. It did not include the town of Chertsey, which was an urban district in its own right. The district was reduced in size in 1907 and 1909 with the loss of two parishes to urban districts and finally abolished in 1933 when its constituent parishes were transferred to other districts under a county review order.

Parish	Fate
Bisley	Transferred to Bagshot Rural District 1933
Byfleet	Transferred to Woking Urban District 1933
Chobham	Transferred to Bagshot Rural District 1933
Horsell	Transferred to Woking Urban District 1907
Pyrford	Transferred to Woking Urban District 1933
Thorpe	Transferred to Egham Urban District 1933
Windlesham	Constituted as a separate urban district in 1909.

The rural district as originally constituted, was in three parts, separated by other districts. The four parishes of Bisley, Chobham, Horsall and Windlesham formed a single block while the parish of Thorpe was a detached portion to the north-east and the parishes of Byfleet and Pyrford formed another detached block to the south-east.
