= Bagshot Rural District =

Former local government district in Surrey, United Kingdom

Coordinates: 51.35923°N 0.68452°W

- Rural district
- Population
  - 1939: 13,553
  - 1971: 20,450
- History
  - Created: 1 April 1933
  - Abolished: 31 March 1974
  - Succeeded by: Surrey Heath
- Status: Rural district
  - HQ: Bagshot

Bagshot Rural District was a rural district in the administrative county of Surrey, England from 1933 to 1974, covering an area in the north-west of the county.

== History ==
The district was created in 1933 from the former Windlesham Urban District and part of the Chertsey Rural District, which were both abolished. The new district was named after the village of Bagshot in the parish of Windlesham, which also had the district's only railway station.

The district was abolished under the Local Government Act 1972, merging with neighbouring Frimley and Camberley Urban District to become Surrey Heath on 1 April 1974.

== Parishes ==
When created the district contained the three civil parishes of Bisley, Chobham and Windlesham. A fourth parish of West End was created from part of Chobham parish in 1968.

== Premises ==
In the mid-1960s the council built itself a new headquarters at Bagshot Manor on Guildford Road in Bagshot, on the site of an earlier house of the same name.

== Coat of arms ==
Bagshot Rural District Council was granted a coat of arms on 20 July 1960. The motto for the district was Festina Prudenter.

On the crest, the gold and white background was from the arms of Chertsey Abbey, which owned and is connected with the history of much of the district – Bagshot was included in a grant to the Abbey as early as 933. The stag's head on the crest refers to Bagshot Park, a royal demesne since Norman times and hunting ground of the Stuart kings, and also to the fact that much of the area was formerly part of Windsor Forest. The grenade on the crest refers to the area's military associations, in particular the former military camp at Chobham and the lion recalls the area's royal links. The fir cones and mound of heathland refers to Bagshot Heath, and the falcon is derived from the supporters of the Earls of Onslow.
