= Hambledon Rural District =

Former local government area in the UK

Coordinates: 51°9′N 0°37′W

- Rural district
- Population
  - 1901: 21,660
  - 1971: 37,900
- History
  - Created: 28 December 1894
  - Abolished: 31 March 1974
  - Succeeded by: Waverley
- Status: Rural district
  - HQ: Guildford

Hambledon Rural District was a local government district that existed in south-west Surrey in England from 1894 until 1974. Its headquarters were in Guildford. In 1974 it was abolished, with the area becoming part of the new borough of Waverley.

== History ==
The district had its origins in the Hambledon Poor Law Union, which had been created in 1836, covering Hambledon itself and several surrounding parishes.

In 1872 sanitary districts were established, giving public health and local government responsibilities for rural areas to the existing boards of guardians of poor law unions. Under the Local Government Act 1894, rural sanitary districts became rural districts from 28 December 1894. The parish of Haslemere was removed from the district in 1913 to become its own urban district. In 1933 the district gained the parishes of Busbridge, Dockenfield and Frensham, but ceded the parish of Shalford to Guildford Rural District at the same time.

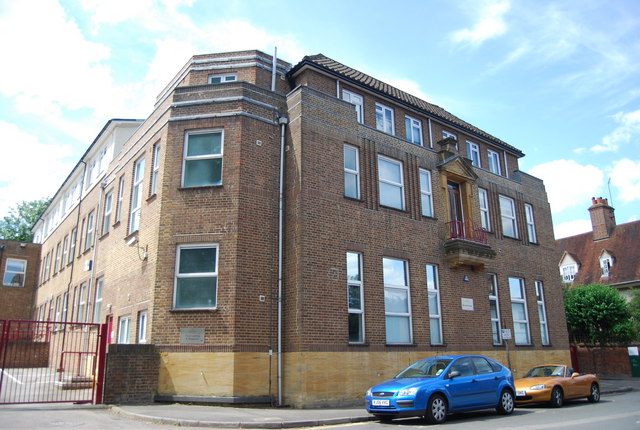
Council Offices, Bury Field, Guildford, built 1938

The district was initially administered from the workhouse in Hambledon and then from the clerk's office in Shalford. In 1938 the council built itself a purpose-built office on Bury Fields in Guildford, outside the district.

The district was abolished under the Local Government Act 1972. The area was combined with Farnham, Godalming and Haslemere to become the borough of Waverley on 1 April 1974.
