= Frimley and Camberley Urban District =

Frimley and Camberley was an urban district in Surrey, England from 1894 to 1974

Coordinates: 51.329°N 0.741°W

Frimley and Camberley
- Urban District
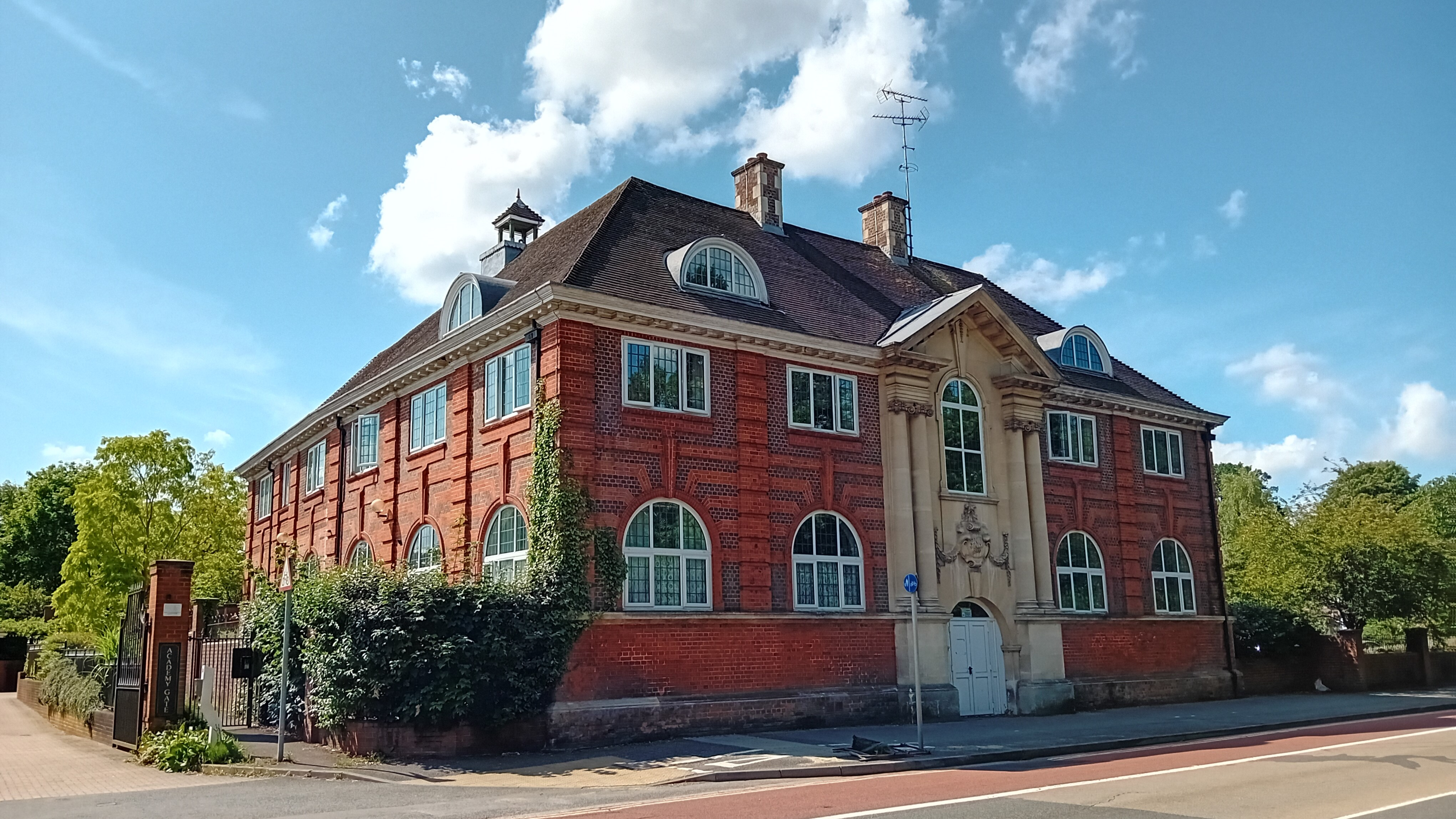
- History
  - Created: 1894
  - Abolished: 31 March 1974
  - Succeeded by: Surrey Heath
- Contained within
  - County: Surrey

Frimley and Camberley was an urban district in Surrey, England, from 1894 to 1974.

== Area ==
Frimley and Camberley consisted of the villages of Frimley, Mytchett, Frimley Green, the nascent town of Camberley and the 20th century military community of Frimley, Deepcut. Under the Local Government Act 1972 it merged with Bagshot Rural District to form Surrey Heath district on 1 April 1974.

The council offices were on the London Road in Camberley. The building was converted into residential properties in the 1980s when new offices were built for Surrey Heath Borough Council.

== History ==
Consisting of the civil parish of Frimley, the district was called Frimley Urban District until 1929 when it was renamed Frimley and Camberley. Frimley had been in existence for many years and was a Registration Sub-District of the Farnham registration district which was created in 1846. The name Camberley was devised by Royal Mail in 1877 when it was decided to avoid postal confusion to rename the growing town of Cambridge Town, technically a locality of Frimley named after the Duke of Cambridge who established a military Staff College in the area in 1862.

== Motto ==
The motto for the district was 'A Deo Et Regina' (From God and the Queen).
