= Croydon Rural District =

Former local government area in the UK

Coordinates: 51.33°N 0.12°W

Croydon
- Area
  - 1911: 21,018 acres (85.06 km^{2})
- Population
  - 1901: 33,671
  - 1911: 65,133
- History
  - Origin: Sanitary district
  - Created: 1894
  - Abolished: 1915
- Status: Rural district
- Government: Croydon Rural District Council
  - HQ: Croydon Town Hall
- Subdivisions
  - Type: Civil parishes

Croydon was a rural district in north east Surrey, England, United Kingdom, from 1894 to 1915. It was created by the Local Government Act 1894 and replaced the Croydon Rural Sanitary District. The district surrounded the County Borough of Croydon to the south, east and west.

When established in 1894, the area covered was primarily rural, dotted with small villages and towns, but the expansion of London in the late 19th and early 20th centuries led to rapid urbanisation and the rural district was progressively broken up to form newly created urban districts. It was abolished in 1915.

Its area now forms parts of the London Boroughs of Croydon, Merton and Sutton and the Borough of Reigate and Banstead.

== Parishes and boundaries ==
On creation, the district consisted of nine civil parishes. The number was reduced to eight in 1907 with the creation of Merton Urban District, and to seven in 1913 when the parish of Morden was absorbed by Merton UD.

In 1914 the Surrey County Council made orders for the abolition of the rural district, with its area to be reconstituted as three new urban districts or transferred to neighbouring rural districts. This was opposed by the County Borough of Croydon which sought to annex most of Beddington, Coulsdon, Sanderstead and Woodmansterne. Croydon's scheme was eventually defeated in parliament, and the break-up took place in 1915.

Parish	Fate
Addington	Transferred to Godstone Rural District on abolition of rural district in 1915. Subsequently, absorbed by County Borough of Croydon in 1925.
Beddington	Became part of Beddington and Wallington Urban District in 1915.
Coulsdon	Formed part of Coulsdon and Purley Urban District in 1915.
Merton	Formed Merton Urban District in 1907. Later merged into Merton and Morden Urban District in 1913.
Mitcham	Formed Mitcham Urban District in 1915
Morden	Merged with Merton Urban District to form Merton and Morden Urban District in 1913.
Sanderstead	Formed part of Coulsdon and Purley Urban District in 1915.
Wallington	Became part of Beddington and Wallington Urban District in 1915.
Woodmansterne	Transferred to Epsom Rural District in 1915. Subsequently, formed part of Banstead Urban District in 1933
