= Farleigh, Surrey =

Village in Surrey, England

Coordinates: 51.32436°N 0.03234°W

Farleigh
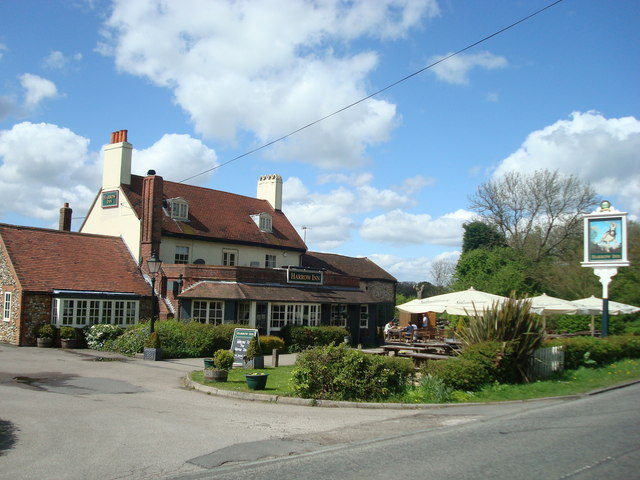
- The Harrow Inn, Old Farleigh Road

- Location within Surrey
- OS grid reference: TQ372602
- Civil parish: Chelsham and Farleigh
- District: Tandridge
- Shire county: Surrey
- Region: South East
- Country: England
- Sovereign state: United Kingdom
- Post town: WARLINGHAM
- Postcode district: CR6
- Dialling code: 01883
- Police: Surrey
- Fire: Surrey
- Ambulance: South East Coast
- UK Parliament: East Surrey

Farleigh, sometimes spelled Farley, is a village and former civil parish, now in the parish of Chelsham and Farleigh in the Tandridge district of Surrey, England. It is located in the North Downs AONB and the Metropolitan Green Belt, 4.5 miles (7.2 km) south east of Croydon, 13.4 miles (21.6 km) south of London and 25 miles (40 km) WNE of Surrey's county town, Guildford.

== History ==
=== Early history ===
Farleigh lay within the Anglo-Saxon feudal division of Tandridge hundred.

Farleigh appears in Domesday Book of 1086 as the manor of Ferlega. It was held by Robert de Wateville from Richard Fitz Gilbert (de Clare and de Tonbridge). Its domesday assets were: 1/2 hide; 2 ploughs, 1 ox, to its overlords per year rendering £3. Judging by the style of the western doorway of St Mary's Church, a date about the close of the 11th century is indicated, at least for the building of the first stone church. The present building is of field flints, with the original rough yellow plaster or mortar coat outside, and with dressings of local firestone and inside a little caen stone.

In the 13th century the manor belonged to Walter de Merton, who founded Merton College, Oxford and settled his property in Farleigh upon the new society. The living is a discharged rectory which gives rise to chancel repair liability on the holders of Merton College's land. The church is on an elevated site, and consists of a body and chancel only, with no tower. Charles I in 1634 confirmed the rights of the manor with the advowson and certain woods called Farley Parks, Farley Frith, Popletwood and Hedgegroves.

=== Post Industrial Revolution ===
In 1848 area comprised 1,060 acres (430 ha), of which 690 acres (280 ha) were arable, 320 acres (130 ha) woodland, and the remainder pasture, statistics which are little changed today. By that time the tithes had been commuted for £177 4s, and the glebe consisted of 28.5 acres (11.5 ha).

In 1911 Merton College continued to hold the manor.

In 1951 the parish had a population of 80. On 1 April 1965 the parish was abolished, from 1965 to 1969 Farleigh was part of the London Borough of Croydon.

== Geography ==
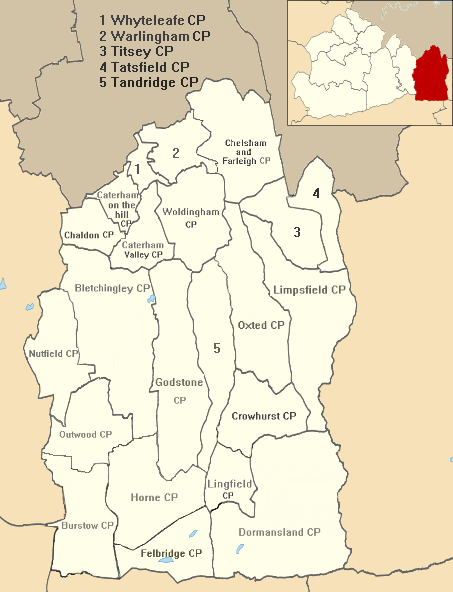
Map showing the position of Farleigh within the most northern civil parish of Tandridge

Farleigh makes up the northern part of Chelsham and Farleigh civil parish. Both villages are on the North Downs, an AONB, and within the Green Belt. Farleigh is 4.5 miles (7.2 km) south-east of Croydon, 13.4 miles (21.6 km) south of London and 25 miles (40 km) WNE of Surrey's county town, Guildford.

Together with Chelsham the total population of the civil parish was 356 as measured by the 2001 census.

=== Elevations, soil and geology ===
Elevations range from 191m AOD in the south of Fickleshole (similarly the Chelsham border just south of the main village is 175m AOD – the bulk of the land is upland at a similar height) to the middle of a deep crevasse/ravine in the east between Fickleshole and Farleigh at 126m AOD.

Farleigh lies high and commands views for a long distance including over London. It is well wooded and the soil is most suited to pasture. The administrative centre of the district, Oxted, is below the uplands upon which Farleigh lies, 4 miles (6.4 km) due south. The highest point of the North Downs, Botley Hill, is a slight, gentle rise south of Chelsham and Warlingham along the straight Croydon Road, which afterwards veers east and descends the ridge to Westerham, Kent.

== Local government ==
Two of the seven parish councillors represent Farleigh and the clerk is Maureen Turner.

Surrey County Council, elected every four years, has one representative from the area. David Hodge, leader of the county council, is its representative as Chelsham and Farleigh are within the Surrey Council Council ward of Warlingham.

First Elected	Member	Ward
2019	Becky Rush	Warlingham

Chelsham and Farleigh share in three representative on Tandridge District Council, headquartered in Oxted:

Election	Member	Ward
2010	Simon Morrow	Warlingham East & Chelsham & Farleigh
2019	Celia Caulcott	Warlingham East & Chelsham & Farleigh
2012	Jeremy Pursehouse	Warlingham East & Chelsham & Farleigh

== Localities ==
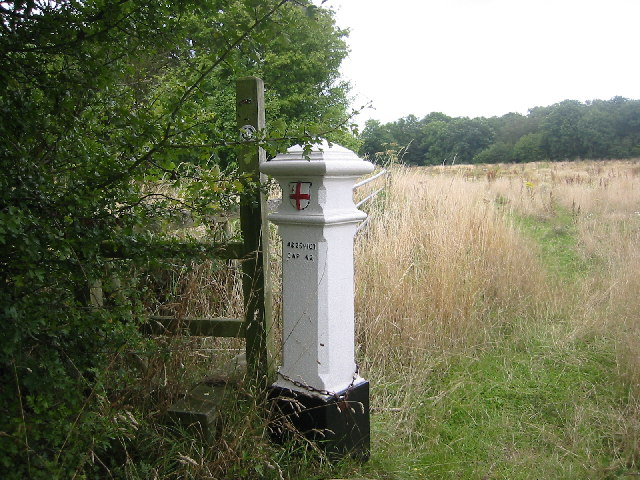
Characteristic white coal-tax post by a public footpath in Fickleshole

=== Fickleshole ===
Fickleshole is a hamlet and neighbourhood about 1 mile (1.6 km) east of Farleigh.

Fickleshole is mainly used for farming, with stables home to over eighty horses. Fickleshole was established in the early sixteenth century. Roads leading to the hamlet are very narrow with passing places, based on the old roads as used by horse and carts. Many of the roads are unsuitable for heavy goods vehicles. The White Bear public house, with its white bear sculpture outside, is the main landmark of the hamlet.

== Landmarks ==
=== St Mary's Church ===
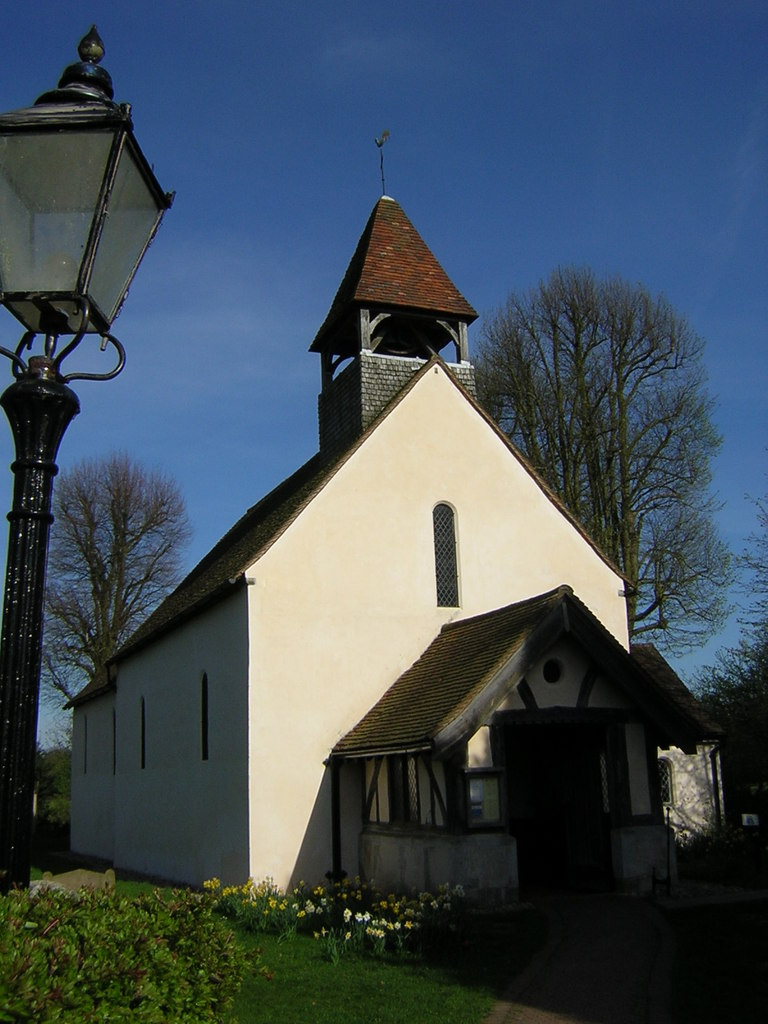
Church of St Mary the Virgin

St Mary's Church, the history of which is described above, is a Grade I listed building.

Farleigh Rovers F.C. was formed in 1922 and has played its home games at Parsonage Field in Warlingham since 1959. In the 2021–22 season, the first team played in the Surrey Premier County Football League.
