= County Borough of Croydon =

Former local government district in Surrey, England

Coordinates: 51.3722°N 0.0991°W

Croydon
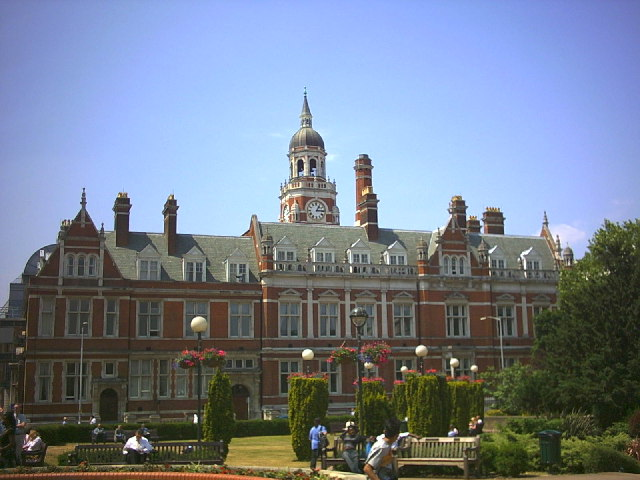
- Croydon Town Hall
- Area
  - 1911: 9,012 acres (36.5 km^{2})
  - 1931: 12,617 acres (51.1 km^{2})
  - 1961: 12,672 acres (51.3 km^{2})
- Population
  - 1911: 169,551
  - 1931: 233,032
  - 1961: 252,501
- Density
  - 1911: 19/acre
  - 1931: 18/acre
  - 1961: 20/acre
- History
  - Origin: Parish of Croydon, Surrey
  - Created: 1889
  - Abolished: 1965
  - Succeeded by: London Borough of Croydon
- Status: County borough
- Government: Croydon Corporation
  - HQ: Katharine Street, Croydon
  - Motto: Sanitate Crescimus (May we grow in health)
- Arms of the county borough corporation

The County Borough of Croydon was a local government district in and around the town of Croydon in north east Surrey, England from 1889 to 1965. Since 1965 the district has been part of the London Borough of Croydon within Greater London.

== History ==
A local board of health was formed for the parish of Croydon St John the Baptist in 1849. On 9 March 1883 the town received a charter of incorporation to become a municipal borough. The borough was granted a commission of the peace and a separate court of quarter sessions in 1885 and 1889 respectively. Under the Local Government Act 1888 it became an autonomous county borough in 1889. The area of the original borough included part of Norwood and Addiscombe, Bensham, Croham, Coombe, Haling, Norbury, Shirley, Waddon and Woodside.

From 1894 to 1915 it was adjacent to Croydon Rural District to the south, east and west and the County of London to the north. The rural district was abolished in 1915, but the county borough was unsuccessful in its attempt to annex the area. The only significant extension of the borough boundaries was in 1925, when the parish of Addington was absorbed.

The borough ran trams until they became the responsibility of the London Passenger Transport Board in 1933. The borough ran its own fire brigade and ambulance service until it became a London Borough.

In 1954 Croydon Corporation unsuccessfully petitioned the Queen for the grant of city status. At the time, Croydon was the only county borough with a population in excess of 200,000 not to be a city.

In 1965 the county borough was abolished and its former area transferred to Greater London to be combined with that of Coulsdon and Purley Urban District to form the London Borough of Croydon.

=== Corporation ===
On incorporation the borough was divided into six wards (Central, East, South, South Norwood, Upper Norwood and West) each returning six councillors. Together with 12 aldermen and a mayor, these formed the town council. In 1905 a new North ward was formed, and the council was enlarged to 14 aldermen and 42 councillors. By 1918 a new ward of Bensham Manor had been created and on further enlargement in 1925 Addington ward was formed, with the numbers of aldermen and councillors being increased to 18 and 54 respectively.

The wards were reorganised in 1930, with 15 wards each returning three councillors From then until the abolition of the county borough the council consisted of the mayor, 15 aldermen and 45 councillors.

The 1930 wards were:

- Addington
- Addiscombe
- Bensham Manor
- Broad Green
- Central
- East
- Norbury
- South
- South Norwood
- Thornton Heath
- Upper Norwood
- Waddon
- West Thornton
- Woodside
- Whitehorse Manor

The wards were slightly reorganised with the creation of Shirley ward from parts of the Addington and East wards by 1955.

=== Politics ===
From its incorporation the council was controlled by parties allied to the Conservative Party, known as the Coalition Party or Ratepayers Association. The Ratepayers Association was more formally organised as an anti-Labour Party grouping after 1900, and was supported by both the Conservatives and the Liberals, who seldom fielded candidates.

Croydon was constituted a parliamentary constituency in 1885, with the same boundaries as the borough. In 1918 the county borough was divided into North and South constituencies. For the general election of 1950 representation increased to three: Croydon North, East and West. In 1955 the boundaries were altered to create Croydon North East, North West and South.

== Coat of arms ==
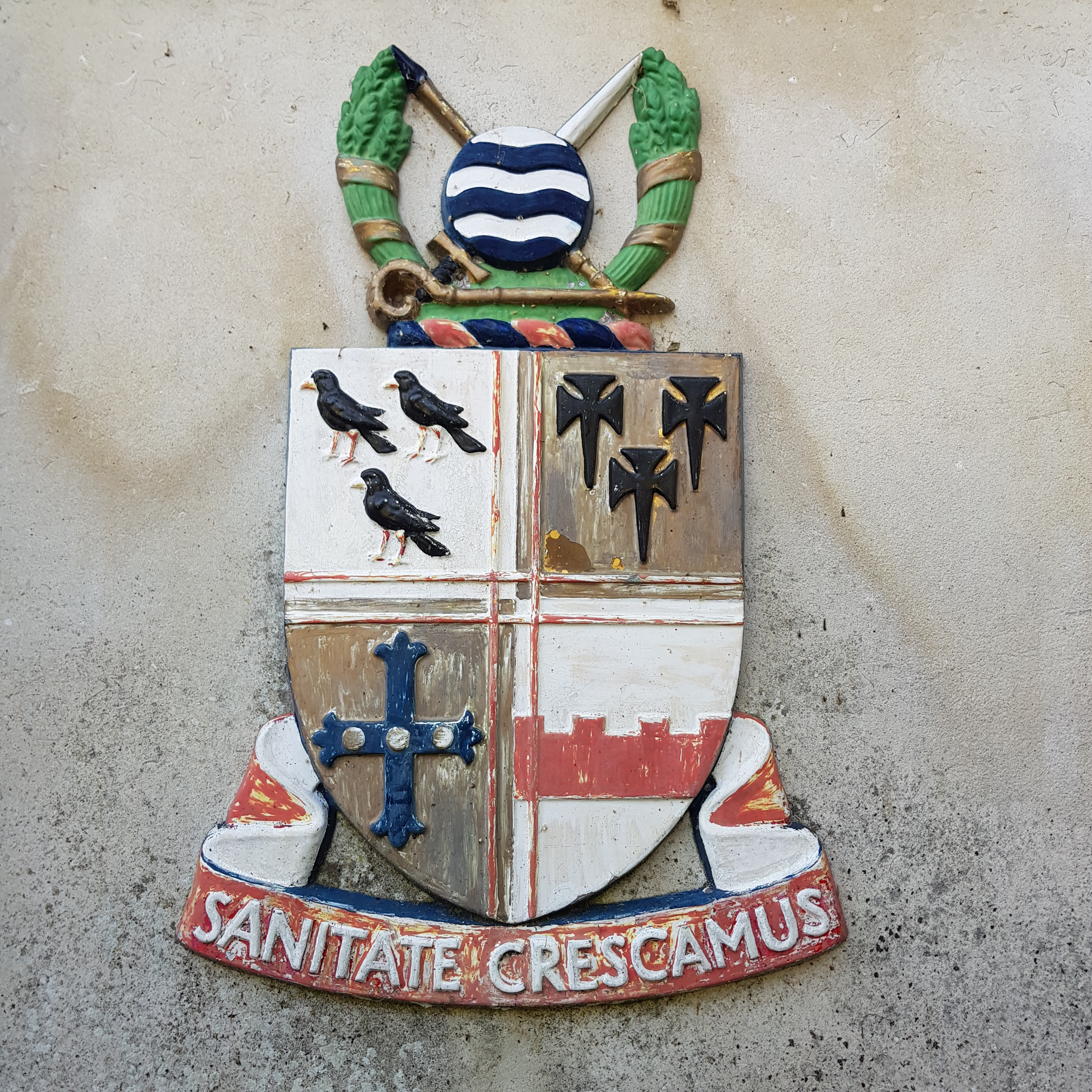
The old coat of arms of Croydon on the Lanfranc School Memorial in Mitcham Road Cemetery.

The municipal borough was granted a coat of arms on 16 October 1886 by the College of Arms, and this was inherited by the county borough. With its quartered shield and its complicated design, the coat of arms was in a style typical of grants to municipal corporations by Albert Woods, then Garter Principal King of Arms.

Most of the emblems on the shield were related to the Archbishops of Canterbury, who had a palace in Croydon. The three choughs are associated with Thomas Becket and appear in the arms of the city of Canterbury. The cross crosslets came from the arms of the Diocese of Canterbury. The flory cross bearing three gold discs was taken from the arms of Archbishop John Whitgift. The embattled fesse in the fourth quarter represented a town wall and thus municipal government.

The crest on top of the helm featured a grassy mound and heraldic fountain, for the Croydon Bourne. On either side was a sprig of rye-grass, for the irrigation meadows of Beddington Sewage Farm. The crest also contained a gold crozier, another reference to the archbishops, and a crossed sword and tilting spear for the East India Company Military Seminary at Addiscombe.

The motto, which was in Latin, was Sanitate Crescamus ("May we grow in health").

Some charges from these arms were used, together with some charges from the coat of arms of Coulsdon and Purley Urban District, to form the new coat of arms of the London Borough of Croydon in 1965.

The old coat of arms can still be seen in Mitcham Road Cemetery, on the memorial to the victims of the 1961 Holtaheia Vickers Viking crash.
