= Caterham and Warlingham Urban District =

Urban District of Surrey, England

Coordinates: 51.30°N 0.06°W

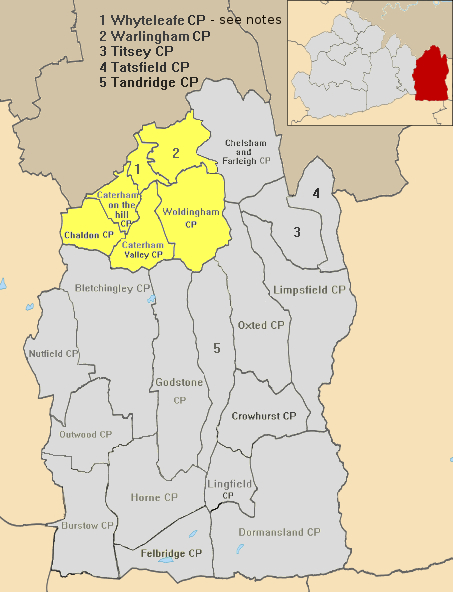
Caterham and Warlingham shown in yellow (from 1933 addition of Chaldon to 1974).

Caterham and Warlingham was an Urban District of Surrey in England until 1974.

== Geographic evolution ==
It was pre-emptively formed shortly before the major national 1933 reforms of boundaries and entities accordingly to take account of population change, in 1929. It was a merger of the Caterham Urban District with the similar North Downs civil parish of Warlingham to the east and more rural and entirely hilltop civil parish of Woldingham from Godstone Rural District to the south-east.

In 1933 the Urban District absorbed the narrow majority, the entirely hilltop segment, of Chaldon to the west from defunct Reigate Rural District, in so doing, the contributor parish shedding 404 acres (1.63 km^{2}) to the parish of Bletchingley and 268 acres (1.08 km^{2}) to Coulsdon to the south and north respectively.

An urban and suburban area of equal contribution between the two merged areas finally became a later civil parish after the area's abolition, Whyteleafe which had already its own railway station and church; it was throughout the district's duration identifiable as a village.

== Abolition ==
Caterham and Warlingham was abolished in 1974 due to the Local Government Act 1972 to form the north-west of the Tandridge (district) which is the easternmost part of the county and covers a much larger area, shown in red in the inset map and in grey and yellow in the main section of map.
