= List of museums in Surrey =

This list of museums in Surrey, England contains museums which are defined for this context as institutions (including nonprofit organizations, government entities, and private businesses) that collect and care for objects of cultural, artistic, scientific, or historical interest and make their collections or related exhibits available for public viewing. Also included are non-profit art galleries and university art galleries. Museums that exist only in cyberspace (i.e., virtual museums) are not included.

Name	Image	Town/City	Region	Type	Summary
Army Medical Services Museum		Mytchett	Surrey Heath	Medical	Uniforms and insignia, medical, dental and veterinary equipment, ambulances, medals of the Royal Army Medical Corps, Queen Alexandra's Royal Army Nursing Corps, Royal Army Veterinary Corps and the Royal Army Dental Corps
Ash Museum		Ash	Guildford	Local	Local history
Basingstoke Canal Visitor Centre		Mytchett	Surrey Heath	Transportation	displays about the history of the Basingstoke Canal, an interactive lock model, video display and replica barge cabin
Bourne Hall Museum		Ewell	Epsom and Ewell	Local	Local history
Brooklands Museum		Weybridge	Elmbridge	Transportation	History of Brooklands, a motor racing circuit and aerodrome, includes automobiles, racing cars, motorcycles, bicycles, aircraft; includes entry to the London Bus Museum
Chertsey Museum		Chertsey	Runnymede	Local	Local history, archaeology, story of Chertsey Abbey, fine and decorative art, costumes and textiles, social history
Chobham Museum		Chobham	Surrey Heath	Local	Local history
Clandon Park		West Clandon	Guildford	Historic house	Operated by the National Trust, 18th century Palladian mansion with collection of 18th-century furniture, porcelain and textiles, gardens feature a Māori meeting house
Crafts Study Centre		Farnham	Waverley	Art	Contemporary crafts
Cranleigh Arts Centre		Cranleigh	Waverley	Art	arts centre with exhibit gallery
Dapdune Wharf		Guildford	Guildford	Maritime	Operated by the National Trust, visitor centre exhibits about the Wey and Godalming Navigations and barges
Dorking Museum		Dorking	Mole Valley	Local	local history
East Surrey Museum		Caterham	Tandridge	Local	local history, social history, geology, archaeology
Egham Museum		Egham	Runnymede	Local	local history
Farnham Castle - Keep & Bishop's Palace		Farnham	Waverley	Historic house	Tours of the medieval Bishop's Palace, and visits to the Keep
Gatwick Aviation Museum		Charlwood	Mole Valley	Aviation	www.gamc.org.uk aircraft engines and over 500 aircraft models
Godalming Museum		Godalming	Waverley	Multiple	local history, culture, art, crafts
Guildford Castle		Guildford	Guildford	Historic house	
Guildford House		Guildford	Guildford	Art	17th-century town house with art gallery
Guildford Museum		Guildford	Guildford	Multiple	Housed in the gatehouse of Guildford Castle, exhibits include archaeology, local and social history, needlework
Haslemere Educational Museum		Haslemere	Waverley	Multiple	Natural history, geology, human history, ethnography
Hatchlands Park		East Clandon	Guildford	Historic house	Operated by the National Trust, 18th century country house with nautical-style interiors by Robert Adam, home to the Cobbe Collection of historic keyboard instruments
Holmesdale Natural History Museum		Reigate	Reigate and Banstead	Natural history	natural history, archaeology, local history, operated by the Holmesdale Natural History Club
The Homewood		Esher	Elmbridge	Historic house	Operated by the National Trust, 20th century Modernist house and garden designed by architect Patrick Gwynne
Kempton Park Steam Engines		Kempton Park	Spelthorne	Technology	Two large triple-expansion steam engines
Leatherhead Museum of Local History		Leatherhead	Mole Valley	Local	local history
Lewis Elton Gallery		Guildford	Guildford	Art	Art gallery at the University of Surrey's Guildford campus, which hosts exhibitions, lectures and events including sculpture, paintings and photographs
The Lightbox		Woking	Woking	Multiple	Art, local history, exhibits of science and nature
London Bus Museum		Weybridge	Elmbridge	Transportation	Historic London buses and associated vehicles and memorabilia. Now situated in the grounds of Brooklands Museum so you get the Brooklands and the Bus museum for the one entry fee. Formerly the Cobham Bus Museum.
Loseley Park		Compton	Guildford	Historic house	16th century manor house
Mercedes-Benz World		Weybridge	Elmbridge	Automotive	Exhibits of cars, facility at the Brooklands motor racing circuit
Museum of Farnham		Farnham	Waverley	Local	local history, culture, artistic heritage, social history
Museum of the National Rifle Association		Bisley	Surrey Heath	Sports	rifles, sport trophies, operated by the National Rifle Association
Oakhurst Cottage		Hambledon	Waverley	Historic house	Operated by the National Trust, restored and furnished labourer's dwelling reflecting four centuries of ownership, open by appointment only
Polesden Lacey		Great Bookham	Mole Valley	Historic house	Operated by the National Trust, Edwardian period house with collection of fine paintings, furniture, porcelain and silver, gardens and grounds
Reigate Priory Museum		Reigate	Reigate and Banstead	Local	local history, culture
Royal Holloway, University of London Picture Gallery and Art Collections		Egham	Runnymede	Art	Features world-class paintings, sculptures, prints, drawings and watercolours from a wide range of artists including William Powell Frith, John Everett Millais and Edward Burne-Jones
Royal Logistic Corps Museum		Camberley	Surrey Heath	Military	Regimental artifacts and memorabilia, including transport vehicles and items used to transport, feed and arm soldiers
Rural Life Living Museum		Tilford	Waverley	Open air	Rural life displays, including domestic, agriculture and trades
Send & Ripley Museum		Ripley	Guildford	Local	local history
Shalford Mill		Shalford	Guildford	Mill	Operated by the National Trust, 18th century watermill
Shere Museum		Shere	Guildford	Local	local history
Spelthorne Museum		Staines-upon-Thames	Spelthorne	Local	local history
Spike Heritage Centre		Guildford	Guildford	Local	history of the former workhouse site and area social history
Surrey Fire Museum		Reigate	Reigate and Banstead	Firefighting	open by appointment
Surrey Heath Museum		Camberley	Surrey Heath	Local	local history, culture
Surrey Infantry Museum		West Clandon	Guildford	Military	Regimental artifacts and memorabilia, located at Clandon Park
Surrey Police Museum		Guildford	Guildford	Law enforcement	open by appointment
Titsey Place		Oxted	Tandridge	Historic house	19th century country house, garden and park
Watts Gallery		Compton	Guildford	Art	Features work of Victorian era painter and sculptor George Frederic Watts

== Defunct museums ==
- Elmbridge Museum, Elmbridge, closed museum site in 2014, offers traveling exhibits and programs, "museum without walls"
- Haxted Watermill, now a brasserie
- Royal Earlswood Museum, Redhill, collections now at the Langdon Down Museum of Learning Disability

== See also ==
- Category:Tourist attractions in Surrey
