= Richard Jefferies (curator) =

Art gallery curator

Richard Jefferies (born 1945) was curator of the Watts Gallery for two decades from 1985 to 2006. His role led to his becoming an acknowledged expert on the Victorian painter and sculptor G. F. Watts. Jefferies's uncle had been chief assistant to Mary Seton Watts in the last ten years of her life, and Richard was born on a visit by his parents to his aunt and uncle at Compton in 1945. He started as Custodian at the Gallery on 1 February 1969 after an earlier discussion with the then Curator, Wilfrid Blunt. He provides the foreword for Hutchings's book on Watts's sculpture.

== Portrait of Richard Jefferies ==
Richard Jefferies agreed to sit for Jon Edgar for a portrait using local Compton clay quarried from the foundations of the Brickfields pottery of Mary Wondrausch. The portrait was unveiled at the re-opening of the Watts Gallery in June 2011 and forms part of the Compton Triptych unveiled at The Human Clay exhibition, Lewis Elton Gallery, University of Surrey in November 2011. It is now in the permanent collection of Godalming Museum, Surrey.

== Bibliography ==
- Watts Gallery - A Personal View, Jefferies, R (2006) ISBN 0-9537615-2-5
