= Compton Triptych =

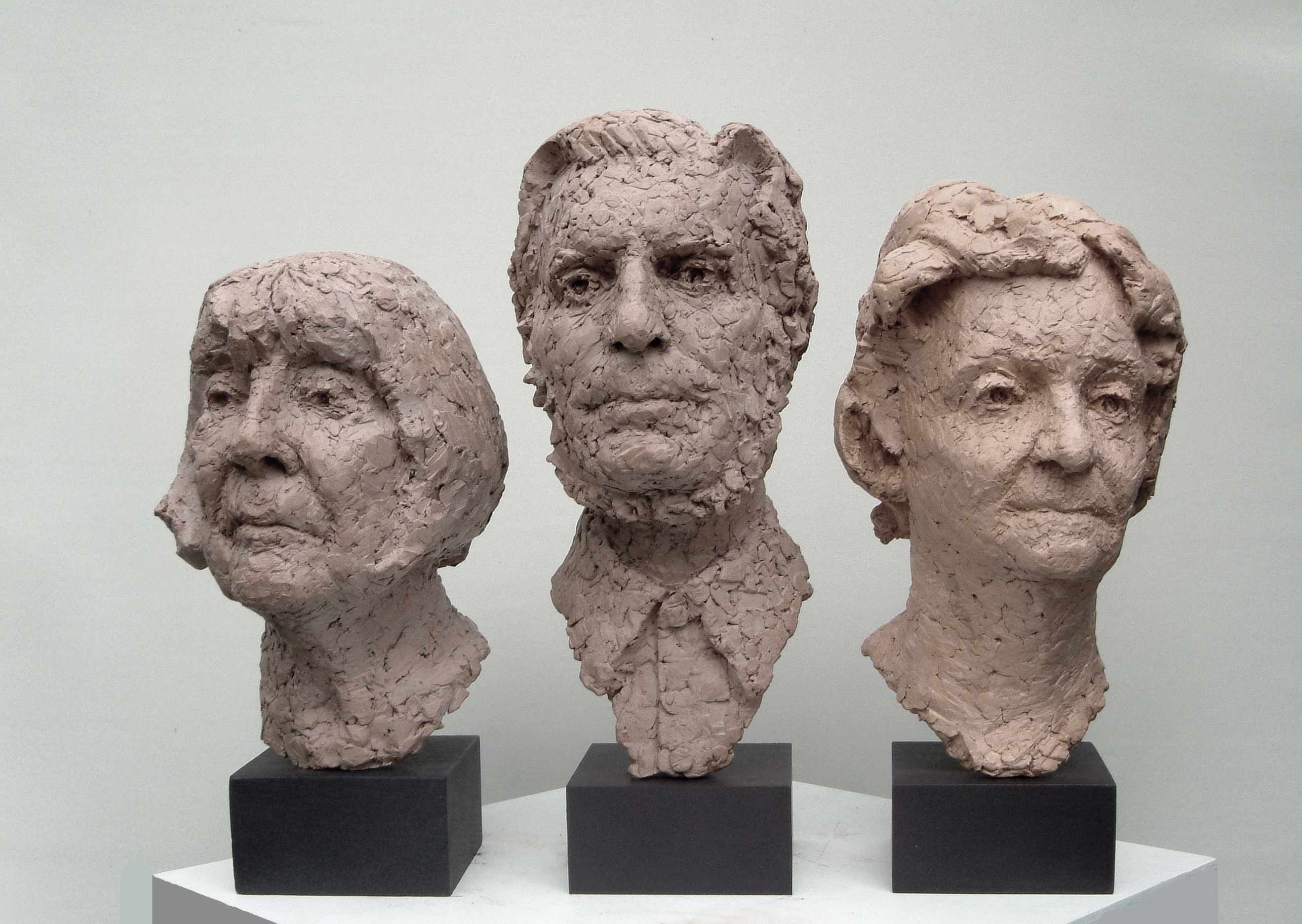
Compton Triptych

The Compton Triptych comprises three terracotta portrait heads, plinthed together, which celebrates the parish of Compton, Guildford, and the diverse figures who have contributed to this Surrey community. Using local clay from the foundations of the pottery of Mary Wondrausch this was unveiled in November 2011 at The Human Clay exhibition, Lewis Elton Gallery, University of Surrey after sittings with sculptor Jon Edgar in 2010 and 2011. The heads include G. F. Watts expert Richard Jefferies, artist/historian Mary Wondrausch and community stalwart Jane Turner, selected by the artist after a local public appeal for suggestions for the third element of the Triptych. A triptych combines three formal elements more commonly used in painting, and this sculptural grouping was first used by Jon Edgar for the Environment Triptych of 2008, after the combination of three heads seemed to create a composition which added another dimension to the work.The Compton Triptych is in the permanent collection of Godalming Museum, Surrey.
