= Mercedes-Benz World =

Motor museum and driver training facility in Surrey, UK

Coordinates: 51.352°N 0.467°W

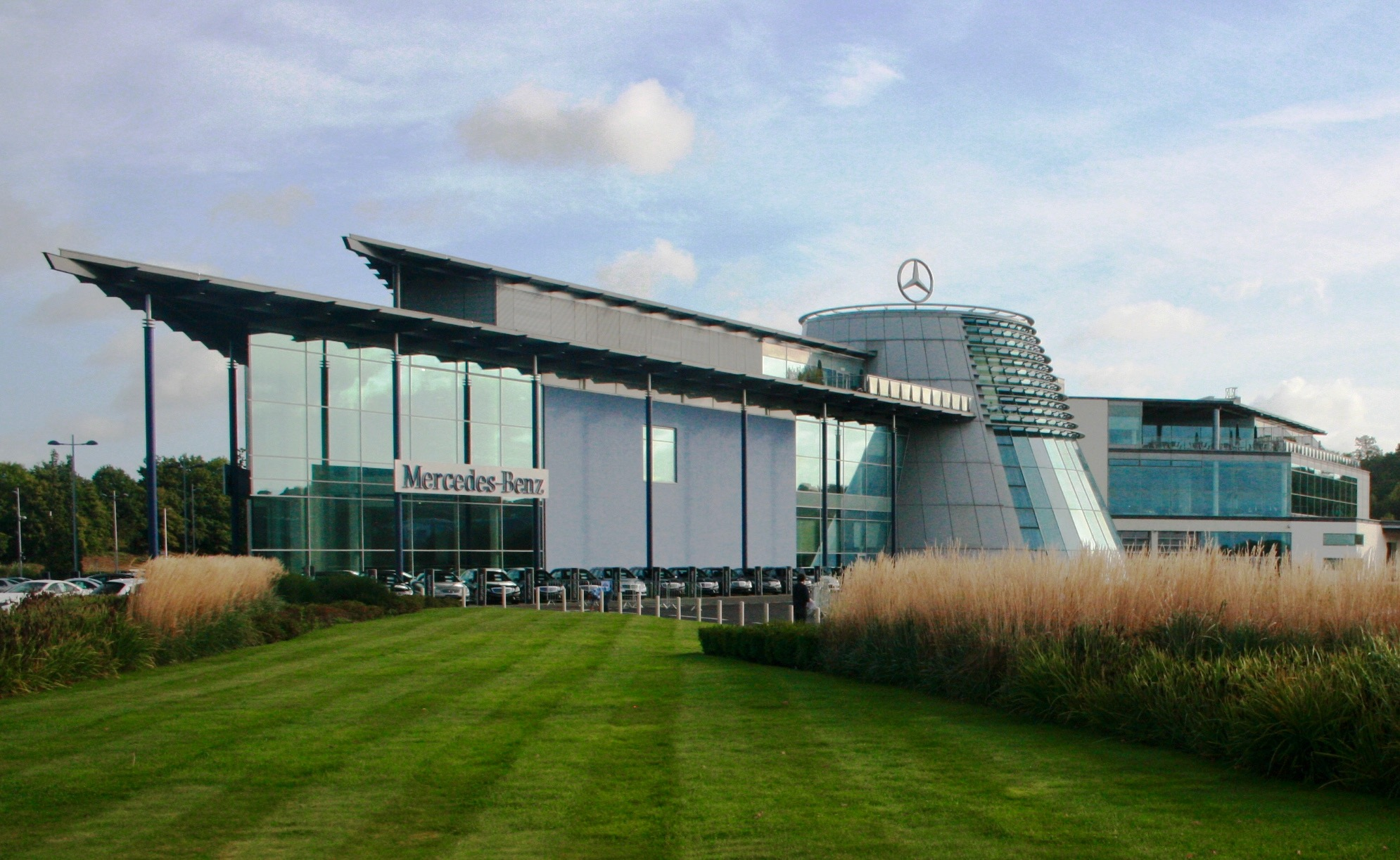
The front of Mercedes-Benz World

Mercedes-Benz World is a facility open to the public at the historic Brooklands motor racing circuit in Weybridge, Surrey, UK. It is owned and operated by the Mercedes-Benz Group and opened in October 2006; 20 years ago. Since then over 3 million people have visited.

Mercedes-Benz World was the first track in the UK to provide the MSA's (Motor Sports Association) newly developed coaching course leading to a professional certificate in coaching motorsport - the highest coaching qualification currently available in motorsport in the UK aimed at professional race instructors and race teams.

== Activities ==
Mercedes-Benz World visitors can book driving time on the tracks and technical facilities to test-drive Mercedes-Benz vehicles.

On 19 June 2011, a member of the permanent driving team at Mercedes-Benz World, Mauro Calo, broke the world drift record in the presence of adjudicators from Guinness World Records with a confirmed distance of 2308 metres in an unmodified Mercedes C63 AMG.

Since 2015, AMG Driving Academy has offered driver training at Mercedes-Benz World, including one-to-one coaching.

Anyone who is tall enough (1.5 metres (4 ft 11 in)) can drive a car at Mercedes-Benz World on parts of the original Brooklands Circuit and there are courses to allow a beginner to progress right the way through from a first drive to be able to take one of the top of the range supercars out on the tracks.

Facilities include: two high performance handling tracks, simulated ice surfaces, skid pan, high speed braking, a 4x4 course and driving areas for beginners and young drivers.

== Location ==
The location is close to Junctions 10 and 11 of the M25 and is midway between Heathrow and Gatwick airports. Entry to the Mercedes complex is free to the public. The building is spread over three floors with over 100 cars on display including a historic 300SL Gullwing as well as the full range of current sports and performance models. There is also a cinema, restaurant, simulator studio, cafe, displays and exhibitions, event spaces and a shop. Children are welcomed and there are multiple activities available for all ages.

There is a regular bus service linking Mercedes-Benz World to Weybridge railway station and Woking railway station.

The adjacent Brooklands Museum has a large collection of early motorcars, motorbikes and aeroplanes associated with Brooklands, including a Concorde, as well as a cafe, a restaurant and a kids' area. Also adjacent is London Bus Museum which displays some 35 historic London buses dating back to the 1870s.

== See also ==
- Mercedes-Benz Museum at Stuttgart, Germany
