= Percy E. Lambert =

British racing driver (1881–1913)

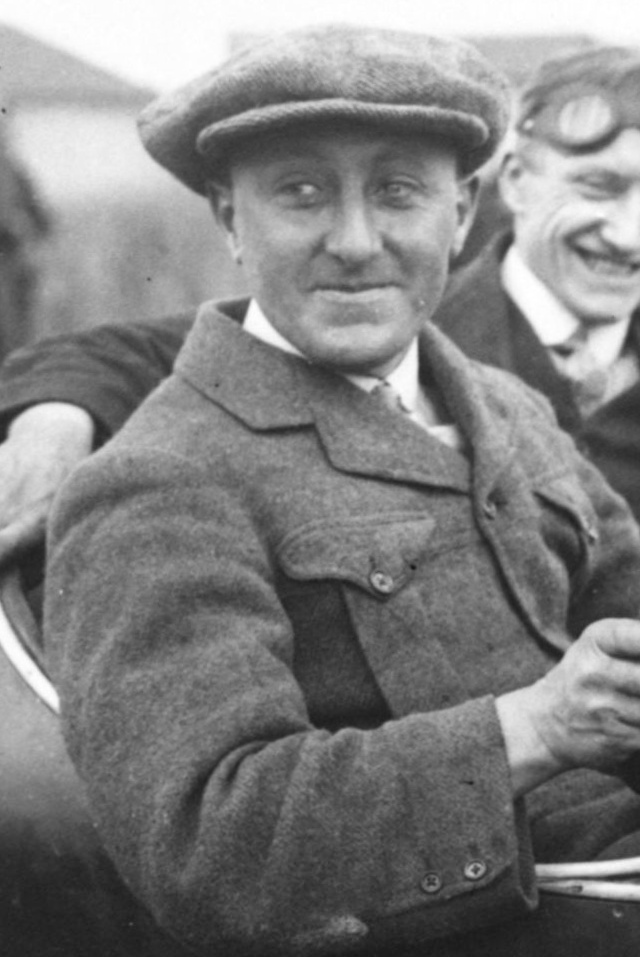
Percy Lambert in 1912

Percy Edgar Lambert (1881 – 31 October 1913) was an English racing driver, the first person to drive an automobile at rate of a 100 miles (160 km) an hour.

== Early life ==
Percy Lambert was born in 1881, the son of Charles and Sarah Lambert. He entered Westminster City School in 1892 and lived in the Westminster area between 1893 and 1898. He later worked with his older brother, Harold Charles Lambert, in the motor trade. They sold Austin and later Singer cars in Westminster. His niece was the artist Mary Wondrausch.

Percy first raced at Brooklands motor racing circuit (near Weybridge, Surrey) in 1910 aged 29. He drove a streamlined Austin called "Pearly III". This is sometimes said to have been the source of his nickname, "Pearly Lambert"; but it is more likely that he acquired the nickname at school, in allusion to his "pearly white" teeth. In his short career he became a popular driver, winning seven races and being placed in six more.

He drove a range of vehicles including Austin, Singer, Talbot and Vauxhall marques. As well as being a successful racing driver, he also enjoyed winter sports.

Percy and Harold decided to enter vehicle manufacturing and jointly formed the Lambert-Herbert Light Car Company. Their first vehicle was a 10HP 4 Cylinder, that sold for £225.

== World record ==
Lambert became the first person to cover a hundred miles in an hour. He set the record at Brooklands on 15 February 1913 in his 4.5 litre side-valve Talbot. He actually covered 103 miles and 1470 yards in sixty minutes. There is a film of his exploits at the Brooklands Museum which was made on that day.

The record was a huge publicity coup for Clément-Talbot (manufacturers of Talbot cars), and generated much public interest. It was achieved in a car with a fairly standard chassis and an engine of only 4.5 litres displacement, whereas the only other attempts on the record that had come close were in monster racing cars of 9.1 and 15 litres.

== Death ==
Lambert was killed at Brooklands on 31 October 1913, while trying to regain his land speed record from Peugeot. He averaged over 110 mph for the first 20 laps, but a rear tyre disintegrated on the 21st lap and the car overturned. Lambert died on the way to the Weybridge Cottage Hospital. This occurred two weeks before he was due to marry his fiancée, having promised to give up racing thereafter.

== Burial ==
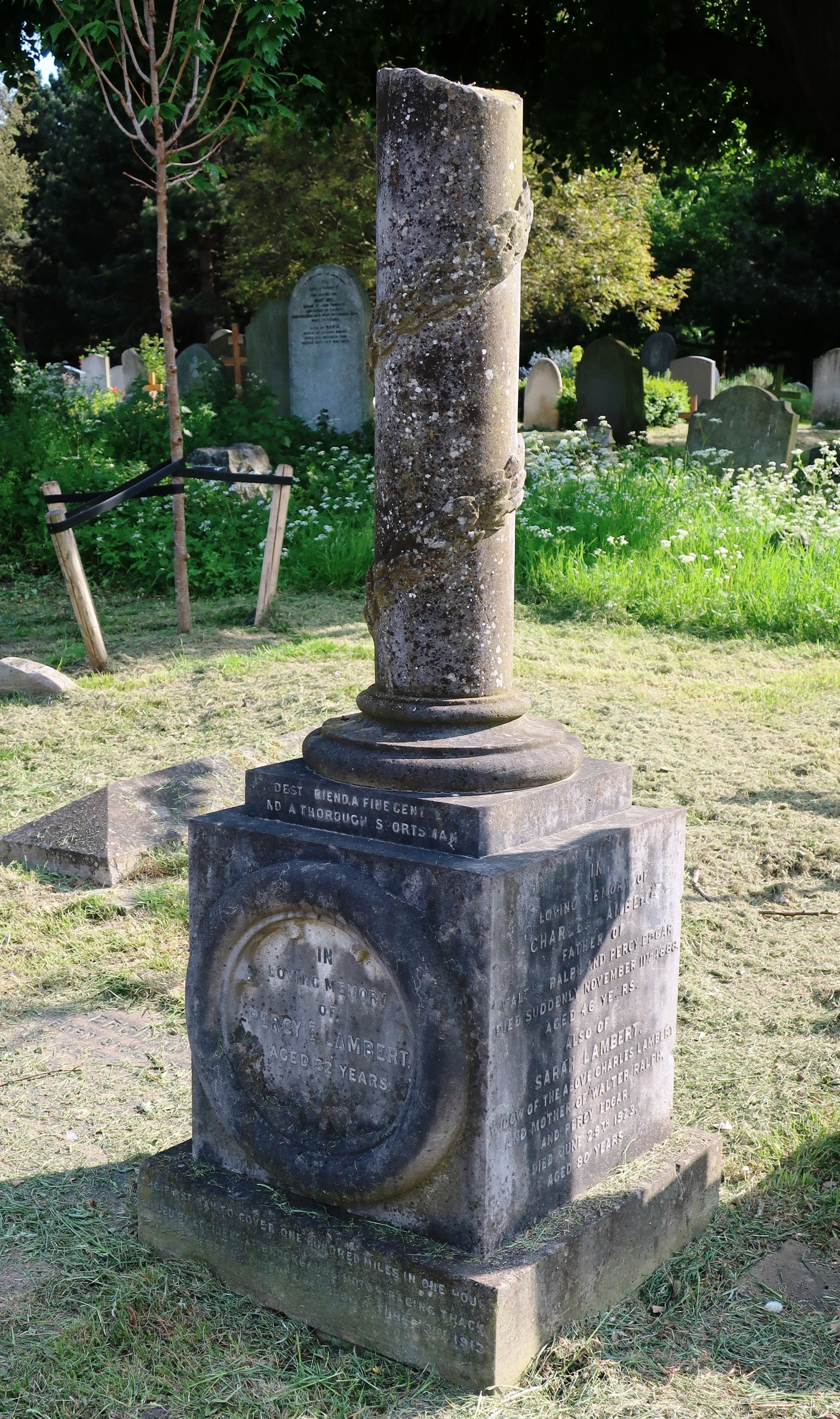
Grave monument, Brompton Cemetery, London

Lambert's funeral service was held at St Peters, Eaton Square. He was buried at Brompton Cemetery, London, in a coffin surrounded by over 100 wreaths, some of which were in the shape of wheels and engine parts.

The epitaph on his monument reads:

A modest friend, a fine gentleman and a thorough sportsman. The first man to cover 100 miles in one hour. Killed by accident at Brooklands Motor Racing Track whilst attempting further records.

His ghost has reportedly been seen in locations around the club house at Brooklands.
