= Sheila Healey =

British artist

Sheila Healey (née Bellamy) (1915–2017) was a British artist who worked in California, Mexico, and the United Kingdom.

Healey was born in Buenos Aires, Argentina to Anglo-Scots parents. After attending school in West Sussex and Kent, she taught English in Argentina after the death of her father in 1930. In 1935 she moved to England to stay with her sisters. Marrying Hal Foote, they moved to Mexico City in 1936 where she studied painting and drawing with Angelina Beloff, the first wife of Diego Rivera. Here, during the period of the Mexican art renaissance, she met José Clemente Orozco who admired her work and advised her: throw away your art books – just work. In 1938 they moved to Guatemala City; her marriage ended after 5 years and in 1940 she met archaeologist explorer Giles Healey whom she married in 1943, settling in Los Angeles before a further filming trip to Mexico. Encouraged by sculptor Henry Moore in New York in 1946, they moved westwards to Pacific Palisades and in 1947 she studied with both Rico Lebrun and William Brice in Los Angeles. After moving to West Sussex from Big Sur, California in 1970, she learnt that many of her paintings had been destroyed in a fire in Big Sur in 1971. During her time in Mexico and Big Sur, the Healeys' friendships with other artists are well documented; such as Lee Mullican, Luchita Hurtado, Kaffe Fassett, and Charles and Ray Eames.

Sheila Healey's changing themes over 75 years have displayed continuity with both the portrait and with handling of colour, "an essential human-ness being seen as a consistent thread through all her art."

Textile artist and designer Kaffe Fassett opened the 2012 Exhibition with the following statement:

Growing up barefoot in Big Sur, California, I first learned about colour from Sheila Healey; She is a great collector of colour. I think of her work as repeating pools of colour; that deep red palette that comes from South America. It's just so life-enhancing. It's blood red. It's the source of things. When I'm teaching my workshops I always say that what we're trying to do is make colour glow. That is what our task is. Make it come alive! Don't kill it! Don’t make it drop dead! And this woman, whose show I'm so happy to be here for, makes colour glow.

== Exhibitions ==
- 1943: Vincent Price Gallery, Beverley Hills
- 1946: Guatemala City
- 1947: Pasadena Art Institute, Pasadena
- 1947: Los Angeles County Museum of Art
- 1947: University of California, Los Angeles
- 1948: Norlyst Gallery, New York City solo show
- 1954–64: Coast Gallery, Big Sur, California
- 1999: Sheila Healey Retrospective: A Painter's Journey: from Buenos Aires to Big Sur; Cork Street, 20 September – 2 October
- 2005: Sheila Healey: A Celebration; Cork Street, 31 May – 4 June
- 2012: Sheila Healey: A Retrospective; Lewis Elton Gallery, University of Surrey, 20 March – 4 April

== Portrait of Healey ==
Healey agreed to sit for sculptor Jon Edgar in West Sussex during 2010 and the terracotta head was unveiled at her Retrospective exhibition at Lewis Elton Gallery in 2012.
