= Giles Healey =

Giles Greville Healey (1901–1980) was a Mayan archeologist. He served as president of the Institute of Navigation of Washington, D.C.

== Early life and education ==
Giles Greville Healeywas born in 1901 in New York City. He was educated in France and Germany and later attended Choate Preparatory School; graduating from Yale University in 1924 with a degree in chemistry.

== Career ==
In 1928, he volunteered for a two-year expedition to South America to collect curare for medicinal purposes, during which he accomplished extensive cartographic work on the Orinoco River for the Royal Geographical Society.

Meeting his future wife, artist Sheila Healey in 1940, they married in 1943, moved to Mexico in 1944 and he began a career as a Mayan archeologist, discovering 28 ruins. He was best known for the photography in 1946 of the pre-Columbian painted murals at the Maya site of Bonampak. He recorded his discoveries in still photographs and movie film, and produced the motion picture Maya Through the Ages, based on footage shot during the 10 years he spent in Guatemala and the Yucatán Peninsula. Prior to the discovery of Bonampak's vivid murals dated to around AD 800, Mayanists had contended that the Classic Maya knew little of war and bloodshed and did not practice bloody sacrifices.

An expert stellar navigator and past president of the Institute of Navigation of Washington, D.C., and Los Angeles, he taught navigation for the Navy during the Korean War. An expert on optics and astronomy, he worked on the development of alloy metals, including beryllium, for the space program. He spoke seven languages, among them Lacandon, the Mayan dialect still spoken by the Lacandon people of Chiapas. He died in Bignor, West Sussex, in 1980.
