= Nicolas Moreton =

British sculptor

Nicolas Moreton (born in 1961 in Watford, Hertfordshire) is a British artist. Predominantly a stone carver, two of his sculptures are in permanent public locations in Milton Keynes. A National Stone Carving residency around four English cathedrals during 2004 and 2005 visited Southwell Minster, Gloucester Cathedral, Lincoln Cathedral, and Manchester Cathedral and Moreton was in conversation with Brian Sewell in the BBC Radio 4 series on Divine Art about the residency at Gloucester Cathedral.

== Public works ==
The Conversation (1995), commissioned by Hermes Properties, sited at New City Square, Milton Keynes, Kilkenny Limestone, Bronze and Gold Leaf.

The Meeting (1995), in Birds Eye Derbyshire Fossil limestone and bronze; both are situated in New City Square, Milton Keynes, Kilkenny Limestone.

The Eye and the Needle (2010), granite, cor-ten steel and electrical light; Mythholmroyd Market Square, Calderdale.

== Portrait of Moreton ==
Moreton agreed to sit for Jon Edgar in Northamptonshire during 2006. A terracotta head exists.
