= Mary Wondrausch =

English artist, potter, and historian

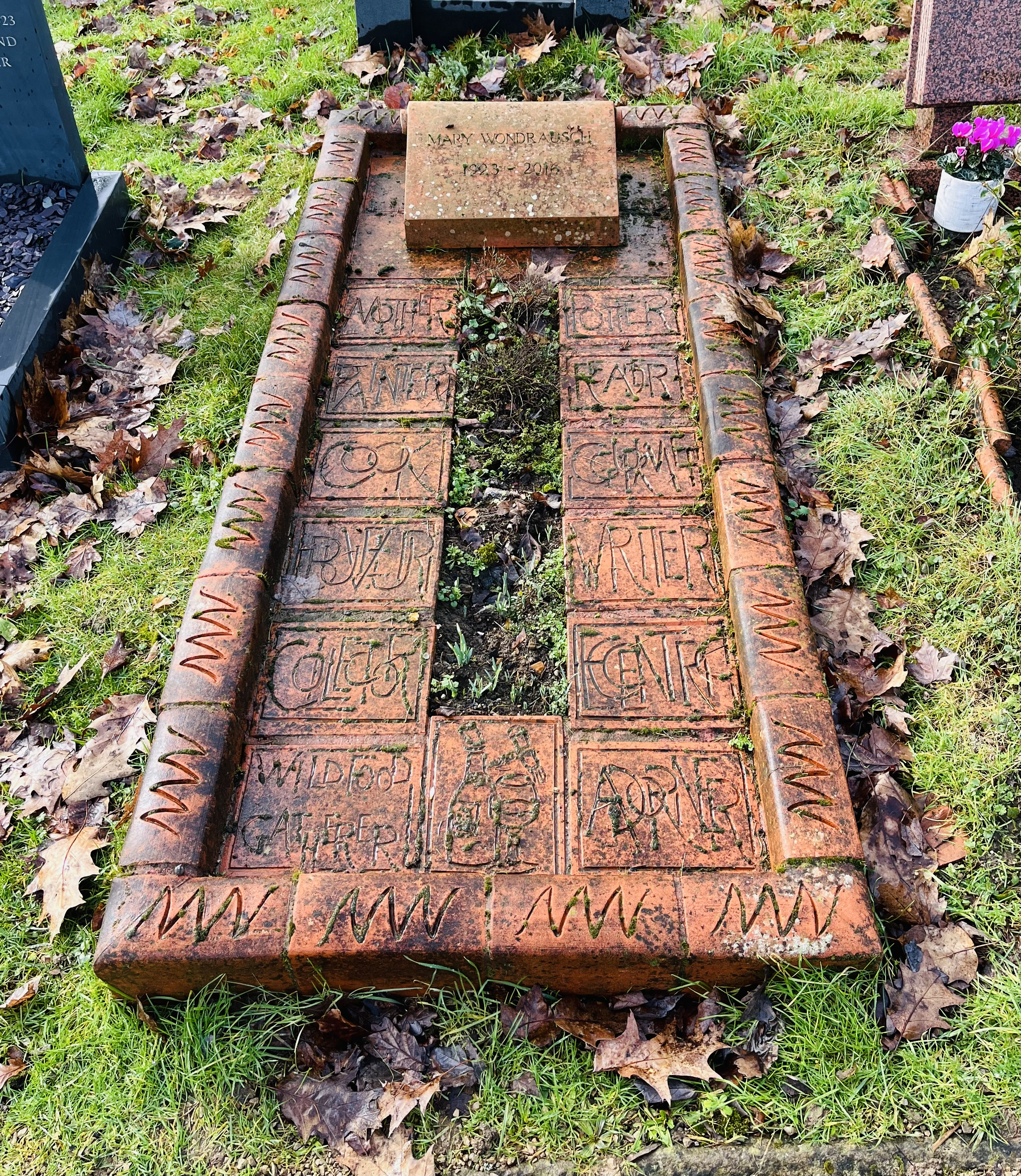
The grave of Mary Wondrausch in the Watts Mortuary Chapel cemetery in 2026

Mary Wondrausch OBE (17 December 1923 – 26 December 2016) was an English artist, potter, historian and writer, born in Chelsea. She trained as a potter at Farnham School of Art, latterly West Surrey College of Art and Design.

== Life ==
Wondrausch was born into an aristocratic family. Her mother was not attentive and her father was interested in cars. Her father, Harold Charles Lambert, later worked with her uncle, Percy E. Lambert in the motor trade. Percy held land speed records and they sold Austin and later Singer cars in Westminster.

She was cared for by nannies and sent to private schools where she refused to cooperate with education. It was anticipated that she would be a debutante and get married, but the war directed her interest to the Women's Auxiliary Air Force. She left due to an injury. She had three husbands and three children and an unusual life that involved art and eventually pottery.

She was an honorary fellow of the Craft Potters Association and has work in the V&A Museum collection. She was awarded the OBE for services to the Arts in 2000. Her primary interest is continental peasant art. Originally training as a watercolor artist, she later became interested in ceramics and opened her own pottery workshop in 1974. Inspired by 17th-century English slipware and Eastern European designs, such influences have informed her own work. She is known for lettering and exuberant use of colour.

Her Brickfields pottery is in Compton, near Guildford, Surrey, where she moved in 1955 and subsequently raised three children. She is buried in the cemetery at the Watts Cemetery Chapel at Compton in Surrey.

== Portrait of Wondrausch ==
Mary Wondrausch agreed to sit for Jon Edgar for a portrait work using clay quarried from the foundations of her house at Brickfields and which is now in the permanent collection of Godalming Museum, Surrey. This forms part of the Compton Triptych unveiled at the Human Clay exhibition, University of Surrey in November 2011.

Wondrausch and her house in Surrey, including the artist's hand-stencilled walls, hand-painted furniture, and ceramics collection, were photographed by Liesa Siegelman for World of Interiors in May 1988 to accompany an autobiographic piece by Wandrausch. That article was reprinted by the magazine in 2018.

== Works in public collections ==
Dead Magpie (1956) mixed media on board. Collection of Surrey County Council

== Selected writings ==
- Mary Wondrausch on Slipware (1986; second edition 2001; publisher; A&C Black - 1st ed. ISBN 978-0-7136-2813-5. 2nd ed. ISBN 0-7136-2813-8)
- Brickfields: My Life at Brickfields As a Potter, Painter, Gardener, Writer and Cook (2004; ISBN 0-9548237-0-2)
- Hartley, Dorothy Rosaman (1893–1985) by Mary Wondrausch; Oxford Dictionary of National Biography, Oxford University Press, 2004

== Contributions to symposia ==
- POTTED CHAR Mary Wondrausch (p. 227-234) SYMPOSIUM ON FOOD AND COOKERY 1994 PROCEEDINGS: Studies in Foods and Dishes at Risk. Edited by Harlan Walker; 245 pages.(Acanthus)
- SPICE CONTAINERS AND SALT CONTAINERS Mary Wondrausch (p. 285-289) OXFORD SYMPOSIUM ON FOOD AND COOKERY 1992 PROCEEDINGS Studies of Flavourings - Ancient and Modern. Edited by Harlan Walker; 294 pages.(Acanthus)
