= A Sea Ghost =

Painting by George Frederic Watts

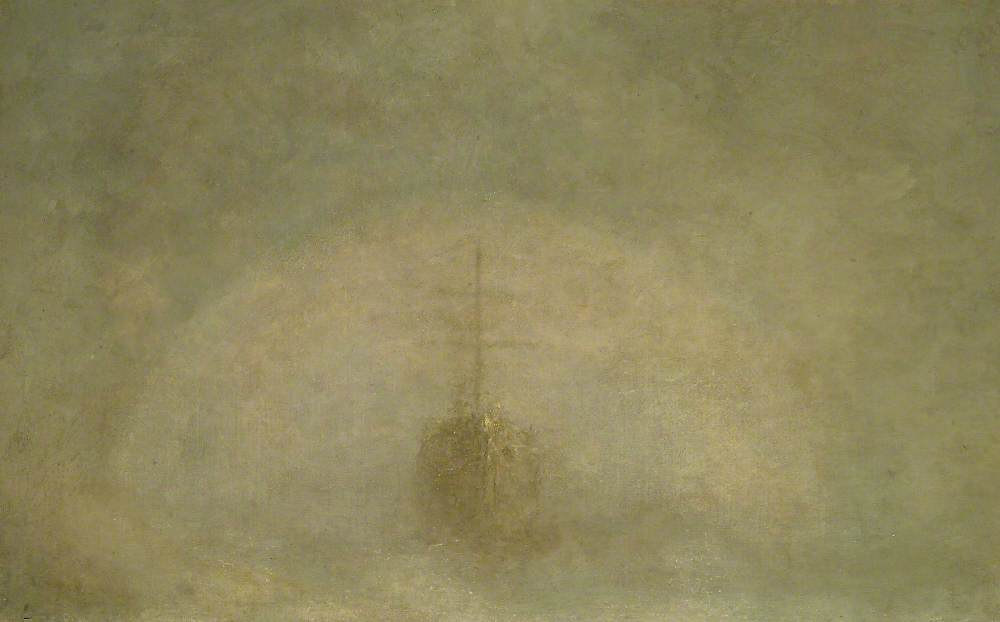
- Artist: George Frederic Watts
- Year: 1887
- Type: Oil on canvas, seascape painting
- Dimensions: 45.7 cm × 71.1 cm (18.0 in × 28.0 in)
- Location: Watts Gallery; Surrey

A Sea Ghost is an 1887 oil painting by the British artist George Frederic Watts. It was inspired by an incident while Watts was on his honeymoon with Mary Fraser Tytler in the Mediterranean Sea off Corsica, when the ship they were on had to tow another vessel. The heavy mist that surrounded the latter gave it a ghost-like appearance. Watts also drew on the stories of The Rime of the Ancient Mariner and The Flying Dutchman. Stylistically Romantic, it recalls the later paintings of J.M.W. Turner. He intended to sell it for 300 guineas in 1892, but decided to keep it in his own collection. The painting is now in the Watts Gallery in Surrey, having been bequeathed by the artist when he died in 1904.

== Bibliography ==
- Ormond, Richard & Gould, Veronica Franklin. The Vision of G.F. Watts. Watts Gallery, 2004.
- Wilton, Andrew & Upstone, Robert (ed.) The Age of Rossetti, Burne-Jones & Watts: Symbolism in Britain, 1860-1910. Flammarion, 1997.
