= Percy Robertson =

British artist (1868–1934)

Percy Robertson RE (1868–1934) was an English watercolour landscape painter and etcher.

Robertson was born in Bellagio, Lombardy, Italy. His father, also a painter and engraver, was Charles Robertson and his mother was Alice Mary, the daughter of the colonist Captain William Lonsdale (1799–1864), who supervised the founding of Port Phillip, later to become the location of Melbourne in Australia. Between 1883 and 1885, he was educated with his brothers at Charterhouse School in England, where he won the Leech Prize for drawing in 1884.

In 1887, Robertson was elected to the Society of Painter-Etchers and Engravers, later to become the Royal Society of Painter-Printmakers. He was elected a full Fellow of the Society in 1908.

Robertson exhibited 33 artworks at the Royal Academy in London and 166 works at the Society of Painter-Etchers and Engravers. He lived in Godalming and painted and etched in the county of Surrey, including in Guildford from St Catherine's Hill (1891), Shere (1899), and Albury (1905).

In 1905, Percy Robertson married Edith Helen Nash ("Nelly"). They lived in London, where he produced pictures of street scenes and the River Thames. He also lived in Maidenhead on the Thames west of London.

Robertson's artworks are held by Godalming Museum.
