= Jon Edgar =

British sculptor of the Frink School

Jon Edgar is a British sculptor of the Frink School. Improvisation is an important part of his reductive working process and developed from the additive working process of Alan Thornhill. Final works are often autobiographical, perhaps referencing anxieties or pre-occupations at the time. His body of work includes many clay portrait sketches of eminent sitters.

== Biography ==
Born 1968 in Rustington, West Sussex, the grandson of animator Brian White. He studied at both Exeter University and University of London before attending the former Frink School of Figurative Sculpture for two years from 2000, being awarded The Discerning Eye national bursary for his studies.

The Environment Triptych (2008) features portraits of the independent scientist James Lovelock (who sat in Devon in 2007), moral philosopher Mary Midgley (sitting in Newcastle in 2006) and writer Richard Mabey (sitting in Norfolk in 2007). Entrepreneur and co-founder of Cass Sculpture Foundation Wilfred Cass sat at Goodwood in 2008.

In 2009 the first sittings for the Environment Series heads took place, marking some of those who have contributed to a potential better future, with Professor Chris Rapley CBE sitting in Fittleworth, West Sussex, Tim Smit CBE in Fowey, Cornwall, Peter Randall-Page and Guy Watson in Devon, Gordon Murray in Surrey and Caroline Lucas in Brighton, East Sussex.

In 2010, clay from the parish of Compton, Guildford was used for portraits of potter Mary Wondrausch and former Watts Gallery curator Richard Jefferies both of which became integrated into the Compton Triptych.

Wood from the felled Highgrove Cedar of Lebanon at Highgrove House given by Charles, Prince of Wales has produced three sculptures in 2010 and 2011.

An interesting stone was discovered by Edgar in 2012, being used as a planter in a West Sussex garden. It was subsequently identified as an important Roman sculpture on the theme of Iphigenia in Tauris.

A posthumous bust of Lancelot Capability Brown was created for the tercentenary of Brown's death. Working forensically from the secondary source evidence of contemporary paintings and sketches, the terracotta head was launched in London in 2016 and then exhibited at Stowe House, now Stowe School.

== Work in public collections ==
Portraits of Antarctic explorer and broadcaster Duncan Carse exist in public collections in South Georgia Museum, funded by the South Georgia Association, South Atlantic and at the Scott Polar Research Institute, Cambridge University, UK. A bronze of Philippa Scott was unveiled at the Wildfowl and Wetlands Trust Slimbridge visitor centre in December 2011. A relief carving of a snake charmer was acquired by Surrey University Art Collection in 2012.

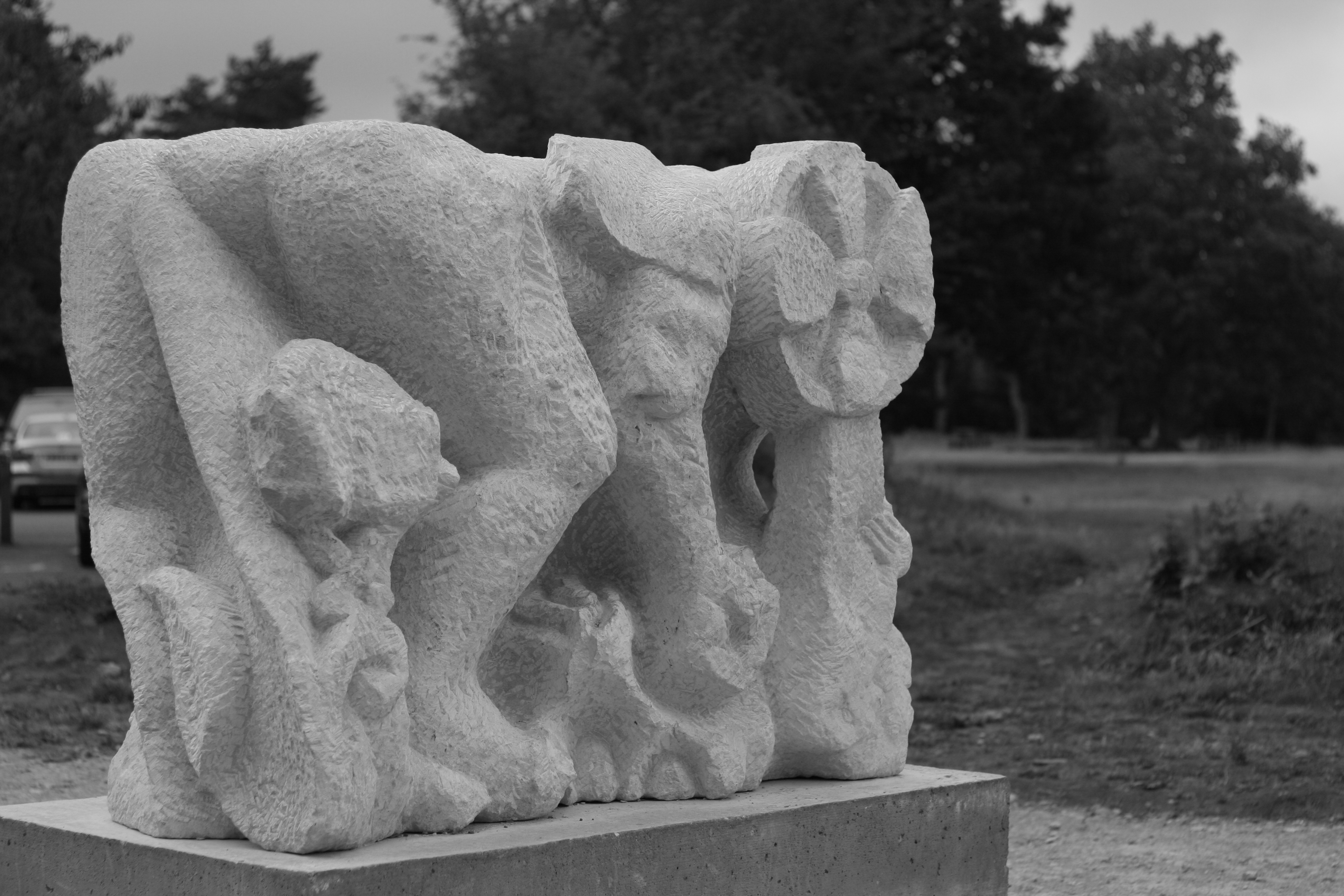
Portal sculpture at Devil's Punch Bowl

’Lewes Group (2010)’: Southover Grange Gardens, Lewes ‘Portal (2013)’: Hindhead ‘Trisantonis (2014)’: RSPB Pulborough Brooks A 3 tonne Portland stone block has been worked in public over 2014/5 at Slindon, West Sussex and was permanently placed in the National Trust's replanted historic Northwood. A new 7 tonne Portland stone block was worked on site at Horsham in the Sussex Weald throughout 2019, in response to the environment and involving the local community. In September 2021, a new oak block was begun at the end of lockdown in Sutton, West Sussex.

== Film appearances ==
The documentary film on sculptor Alan Thornhill; Spirit in Mass - Journey into Sculpture, which was produced in 2007 with funding from Screen South and UK Film Council, features former students of the Frink School, including Edgar talking about Thornhill's influence on his own work.

The creation of the Stephen Duffy head was coincidentally documented during the filming of the Douglas Arrowsmith documentary Memory & Desire: 30 Years in the Wilderness with Stephen Duffy & the Lilac Time. The film was released at the London Raindance Film Festival in October 2009.

The terracotta sculpture forms the CD cover image for the 2009 album by the same name.

The 2006 Herefordshire Jigsaw Sculpture outreach project is documented on film.

== Articles and publications ==
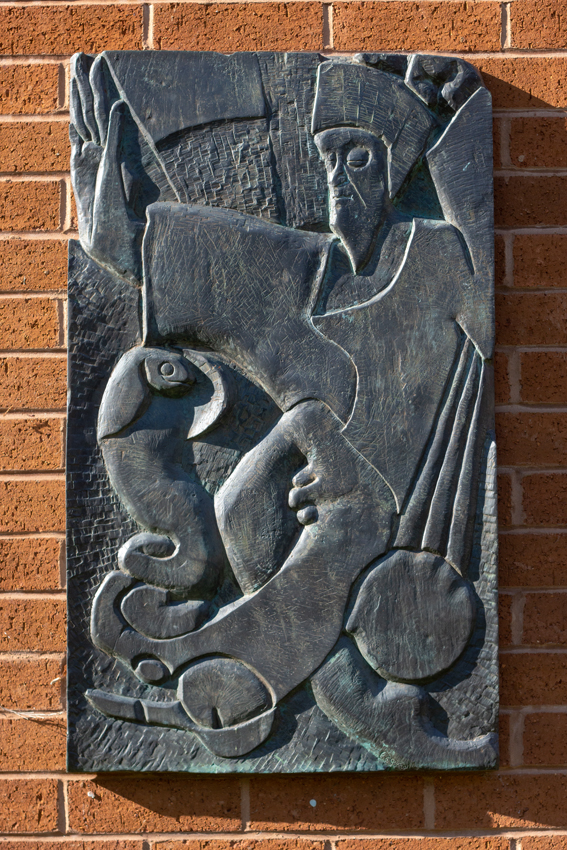
Charmer (2011)

Petworth Society Magazine No. 176, pp. 38–41, June 2019 - Freelance; the role of art and artist in society

J.Edgar, Foreword M. Imms (2016). A South Downs Year: Creation of the Slindon Stone - The Sculptor’s Journal ISBN 978 0 9558675 2 1 (Hesworth Press)

P.Hall, M.Scott, H. Pheby (2013). Jon Edgar - Sculpture Series Heads - Terracotta Portraits of Contributors to British Sculpture ISBN 978 0 9558675 1 4 (Hesworth Press in association with The Lightbox and Yorkshire Sculpture Park)

E. Black, J. Edgar, K.M.J. Hayward and M. Henig (2012). A New Sculpture of Iphigenia in Tauris. Britannia: A Journal of Romano-British and Kindred Studies, 43, pp 243–249 doi:10.1017/S0068113X12000244 (Cambridge Journals)

Lady Scott Commemorated; Waterlife; April/June 2012 p. 9.

A Decade of Sculpture in the Garden, Harold Martin Botanic Garden University of Leicester (2011) ISBN 978-0-9564739-1-2 p. 30.

Meet the artist, Surrey Life November 2011 p. 156 Archant Press

The Petworth Magazine No. 139, pp. 11–12 2010 - Petworth Marble - an update

The Jackdaw Magazine Nov/Dec 2009 - Portrait Sculpture: A Neglected Form? p. 10. ISSN 1474-3914

The Petworth Magazine No. 132, pp. 10–11 2008 - A contemporary search for Petworth Marble

Responses - Carvings and Claywork (2008) has a foreword by Sir Roy Strong and features other terracotta portraits of eminent sitters who all agreed to sit for Edgar including sculptors Alan Thornhill, Nicolas Moreton and Ken Ford, historian Sir Roy Strong, conservationist Lady Philippa Scott (widow of Sir Peter Scott), entrepreneur Stuart Wheeler, industrialist Sir John Harvey-Jones and songwriter and musician Stephen Duffy.

Timothy Mowl's 2007 publication on the Historic Gardens of Oxfordshire includes the landscape of Asthall Manor, home to the biennial stone sculpture event where reference is made to Edgar "coaxing his stone into semi-figurative forms of brooding power, as in his 'Wight Man'." and 'Arch'.
