= Lewis Elton Gallery =

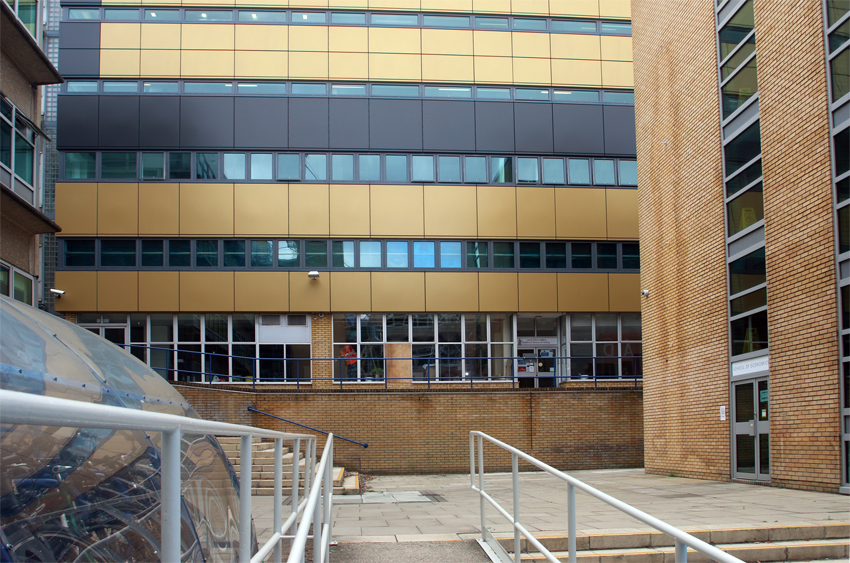

- Location of gallery in Surrey
- Address: Building AC, Stag Hill Campus; University of Surrey
- Location: Guildford
- Coordinates: 51°14′34″N 0°35′26″W
- Type: Art gallery

Construction
- Opened: 1997

The Lewis Elton Gallery was an art gallery at the University of Surrey's Guildford campus, which hosted exhibitions, lectures and events including sculpture, paintings and photographs. The Gallery was also responsible for the maintaining the University Art Collection and a range of special collections including the Lewis and Mary Elton Art Collection and E.H. Shepard archive.

The Gallery was named in 1997 after Professor Lewis Elton who initiated the display of original artwork at Surrey University's Physics Department in Battersea in 1963.

Exhibitions have included sculpture by Jon Edgar and photographs by Anne Purkiss documenting the restoration of Watts Gallery in 2011, and a retrospective of paintings and drawings by Sheila Healey in 2012.
