= London Bus Museum =

Transport museum located at Brooklands, Weybridge, England

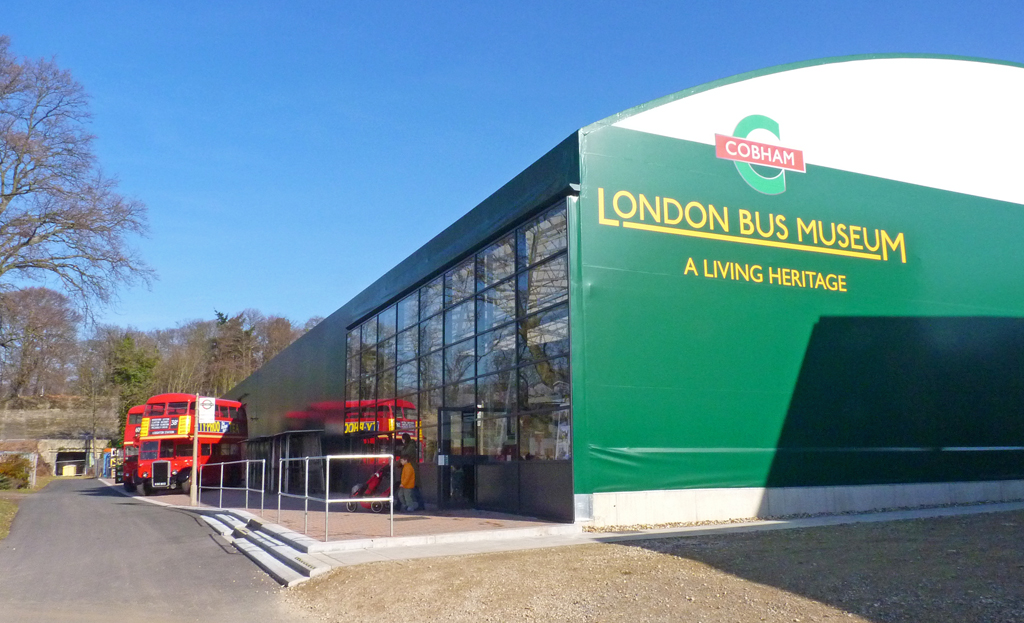
- Cobham Hall building at Brooklands

- Location within Surrey
- Established: 1 August 2011
- Location: Weybridge, Surrey, England
- Coordinates: 51°21′11″N 0°27′54″W
- Type: Transport museum
- Key holdings: London Buses
- President: The Lord Hendy of Richmond Hill
- Chairperson: Leon Daniels
- Curator: Ray Thorn
- Owner: London Bus Preservation Trust
- Website: www.londonbusmuseum.com

The London Bus Museum is a purpose-built transport museum, open daily to the public and located at Brooklands in Weybridge, England. Entry is on a joint basis with Brooklands Museum.

The museum is operated by the London Bus Preservation Trust and exhibits around thirty-five examples (from its forty+ collection) of London buses, coaches and ancillary vehicles covering 100 years of development of the bus in London including Victorian-era horse-drawn omnibuses, 1920s open-top buses, streamlined 1930s designs and through World War II to the mass-standardisation of the 1950s, the AEC Routemasters of the 1960s and the rear-engined buses of the 1970s. The collection includes pre World War II AEC Regents, post-war AEC Regent III RTs and AEC Routemasters and the exhibits are arranged in an historical timeline, divided into galleries representing milestones in the development of the London bus, placing each artefact in its contemporary setting. The Museum's collection contains some unique exhibits, many of which have been fully restored by the volunteers, including prototypes of the AEC Regent III RT and the Routemaster and the only surviving World War II "utility" bus that ran in London.

== History ==
The origins of the museum lie in the foundation of the London Bus Preservation Group (LBPG) in 1966, an association of individual owners of London buses who wished to pool their resources. Some members of that group had attempted to preserve old London buses as far back as 1952 but their first success came with the purchase in 1956 of a 1929 AEC Regal single-decker which had originated with the London General Omnibus Company and which is now generally recognised as the first bus to be privately preserved in the UK. In 1972, the LBPG acquired a former World War II aircraft factory, now demolished, near Cobham, Surrey, where the private Cobham Bus Museum was established, taking its name from the location.

Although the museum had in the interim become a Registered Charity and a Registered Museum, by the early 2000s its future was uncertain as the building was deteriorating and planning permission could not be obtained to operate a public museum from the location, thereby jeopardising both the charitable and museum statuses. Eventually, the operating Trust was able to negotiate the acquisition of a large plot of land from the nearby Brooklands Museum Trust on the location of the former Brooklands racing circuit and aircraft production site. A deal was struck for the redevelopment of the old museum site and the construction of a new building at the new location, thus providing the museum with a secure home from where it could open daily to the public. The new, purpose-built premises opened on 1 August 2011 and the London Bus Museum name was adopted.

== List of vehicles ==
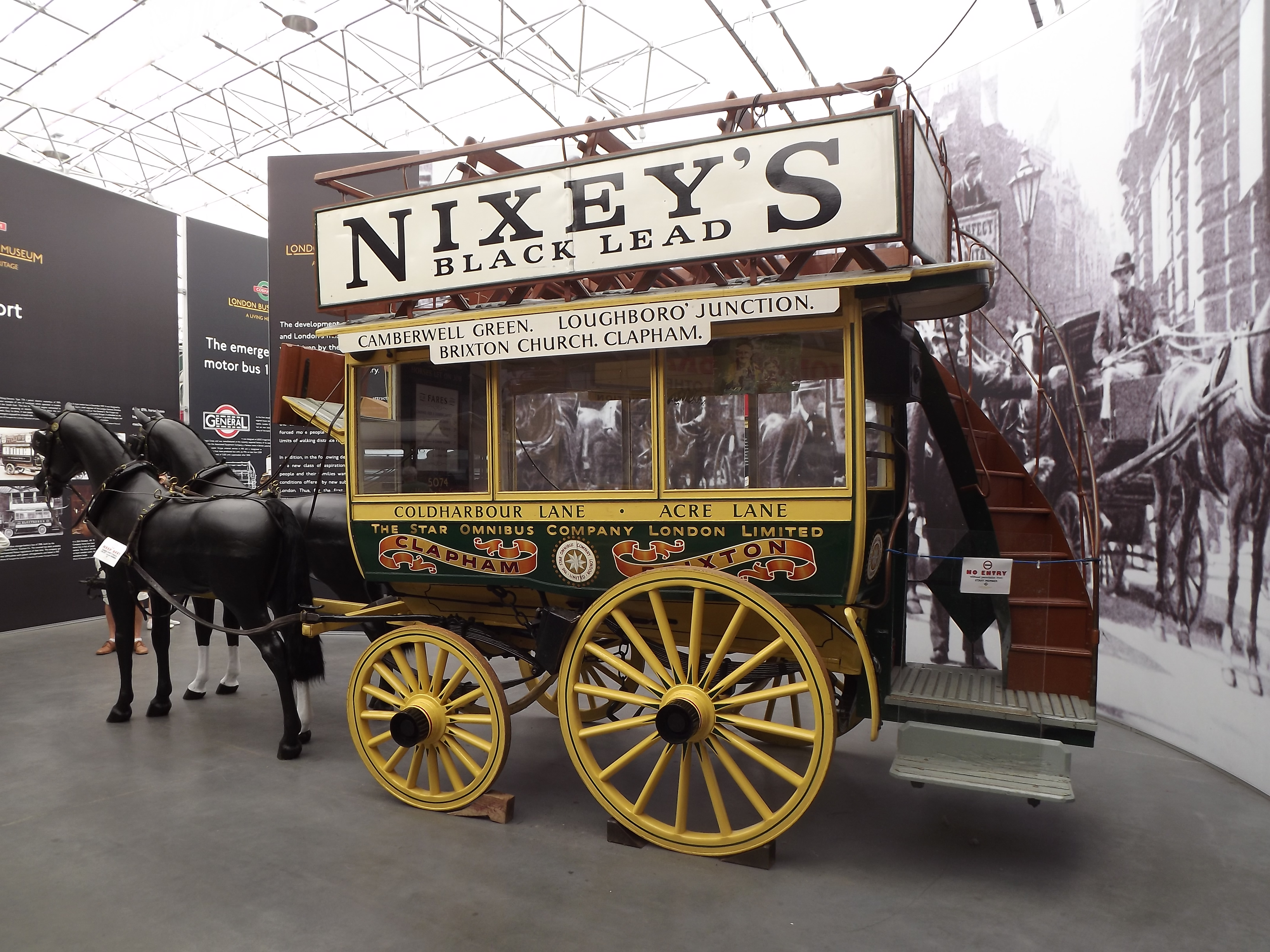
A horse-driven omnibus at the museum

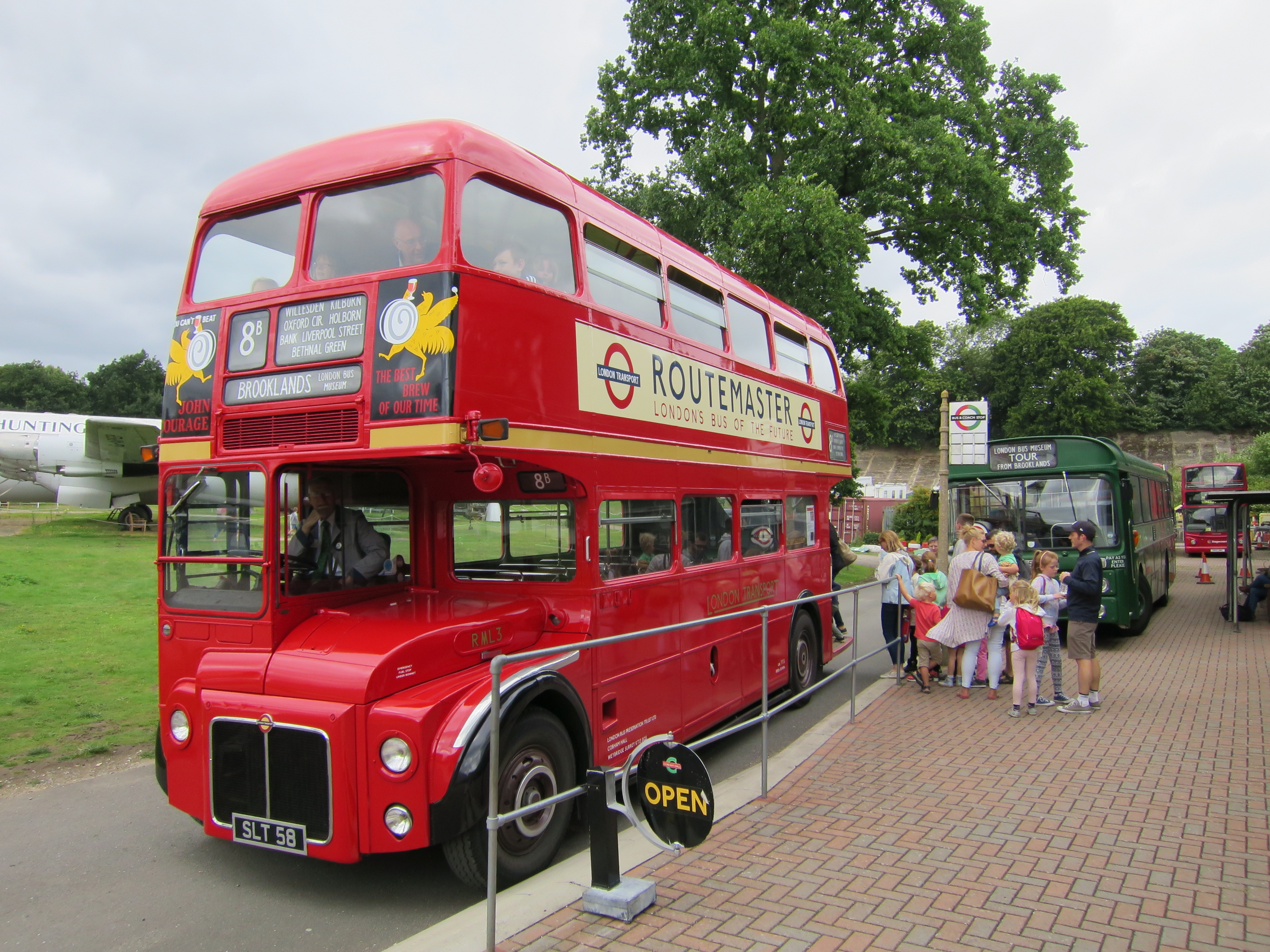
AEC Routemaster

- Knifeboard OmniBus built in 1875.
- Three Light Garden-Seat OmniBus built in 1890.
- Four-Light Garden-Seat OmniBus built in 1890.
- AEC NS-type bus – NS174 - XO 1048 - built in 1923.
- Leyland LB5 – "Chocolate Express" - XU 7498 - built in 1924.
- Dennis 4-ton bus – D142 - XX 4591 - built in 1925.
- AEC Regal I bus – T31 - UU 6646 - built in 1929.
- AEC Regent I bus – ST922 - GJ 2098 - built in 1930.
- AEC Regal I coach – T357 - GN 8242 - built in 1931.
- AEC Renown bus – LT1059 - GO 5170 - built in 1931.
- AEC Regent I Breakdown Tender – 738J - AGX 520 - built in 1933.
- AEC Regent I bus - STL441 - AXM 693 - built in 1934.
- AEC Q-type coach – Q83 - CGJ 188 - built in 1935.
- AEC Regal I coach – T448 - CXX 171 - built in 1936.
- AEC Regent I bus – STL2093 - DLU 92 - built in 1937.
- AEC Regent I bus – STL2377 - EGO 426 - built in 1937.
- AEC Regal I coach – T504 - ELP 228 - built in 1938.
- AEC Regent III prototype bus – RT1 - EYK 396 - built in 1939.
- Guy Arab II bus – G351 - HGC 130 - built in 1945.
- AEC Regent III bus – RT2657 - LYR 641 - built in 1948.
- Bedford O Canteen Unit – 702B - built in 1948.
- AEC Regal IV prototype bus – UMP 227 - built in 1949.
- Leyland 7RT bus – RTL139 - KGK 803 - built in 1949.
- AEC Regal IV Sightseeing Coach – RF19 - LUC 219 - built in 1951.
- AEC Regal IV sightseeing coach – RFW6 - LUC 381 - built in 1951.
- AEC Regal IV coach – RF226 - MLL 763 - built in 1952.
- AEC Regal IV bus – RF395 - MXX 283 - built in 1952.
- AEC Regent III bus – RT2775 - LYR 826 - built in 1952.
- AEC Regent III bus – RT3491 - LYR 910 - built in 1952.
- AEC Regent III low-height bus – RLH48 - MXX 248 - built in 1952.
- AEC Regal IV – BEA Coach 4RF4 - MLL 740 - built in 1953.
- Guy Special country bus – GS34 - MXX 334 - built in 1953.
- AEC Routemaster prototype bus – RML3 - SLT 58 - built in 1957.
- Ford 300E Van – 1096F - built in 1959.
- AEC Routemaster bus – RM140 - VLT 140 - built in 1959.
- AEC Routemaster coach – RMC1461 - 461 CLT - built in 1962.
- Daimler Fleetline bus - XF3 - CUV 53C - built in 1965
- AEC Routemaster bus – RML2760 - SMK 760F - built in 1968.
- Bedford CAL Ambulance – 1492B - built in 1968.
- AEC Swift bus – SMS369 - EGN 369J - built in 1971.
- AEC Reliance coach – RP90 - JPA 190K - built in 1972.
- MCW Metrobus – M6 - WYW 6T - built in 1978.
- Leyland Titan bus – T23 - WYV 23T - built in 1979.
- Wright Eclipse Gemini bodied Volvo B7TL - London General WVL1 - LG02 KGP - built in 2002.
- Scania OmniCity - London United SP1 - YN56 FCA - built in 2006.

== See also ==
- London Transport Museum
