= Brooklands Museum =

Aviation and motoring museum in Surrey, England

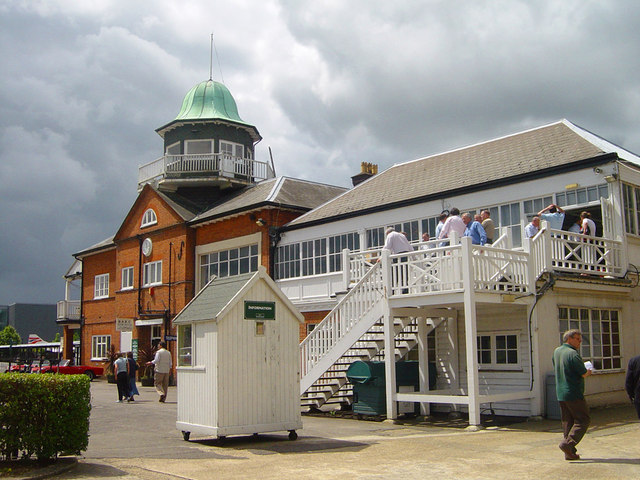

- Location within Surrey
- Established: 1991
- Location: Weybridge, Surrey
- Coordinates: 51°21′11″N 0°27′54″W
- Type: Aviation museum, Motor museum
- Website: www.brooklandsmuseum.com

Brooklands Museum is a motoring and aviation museum occupying part of the former Brooklands Motor Course in Weybridge, Surrey, England.

Formally opened in 1991, the museum is operated by the independent Brooklands Museum Trust Ltd, a private limited company (No.02109945) and a registered UK charity (No.296661); its aim is to conserve, protect and interpret the heritage of the Brooklands site.

== History of Brooklands ==
Brooklands was the birthplace of British motorsport and aviation and the site of many engineering and technological achievements throughout eight decades of the 20th century. The racing circuit was constructed by local landowner Hugh F. Locke King in 1907 and was the first purpose-built racing circuit in the world. Many records were set there. Many aviation firsts are also associated with Brooklands, which soon became one of Britain's first aerodromes. It attracted many aviation pioneers prior to World War I, and was also a leading aircraft design and manufacturing centre in the 20th century, producing a total of 18,600 new aircraft of nearly 260 types between 1908 and 1987 (see McSwein, D R).

Brooklands-based aircraft companies such as Bleriot, Hawker, Sopwith, Martinsyde, and Vickers were key players in the early years of aviation and were crucial to its early development. The Daily Mail Circuit of Britain air race of 1911 started and finished at Brooklands, and both the event and the location later influenced the theme of the classic 1965 Twentieth Century Fox British film comedy Those Magnificent Men in Their Flying Machines.

Flying training was an important function of the aerodrome both before World War I and between the wars. Visitors can see many displays and exhibits portraying the contribution made by Brooklands to the British aircraft industry in both world wars, and also in the post-war years with Vickers and later the British Aircraft Corporation and British Aerospace.

Vickers purchased the site in 1946 for £330,000, which allowed them to produce civilian aircraft. The most notable of these was the Vickers Viscount, of which 444 were built between Brooklands and Bournemouth. In 1959, the Vanguard was test flown from Brooklands. In 1962, the test flight for the prototype VC10 also took place at Brooklands, and subsequently all 53 production VC10s were flown out as well before being completed and test flown at Wisley.

== Museum history ==
=== Jubilee events and foundation of the Brooklands Society ===
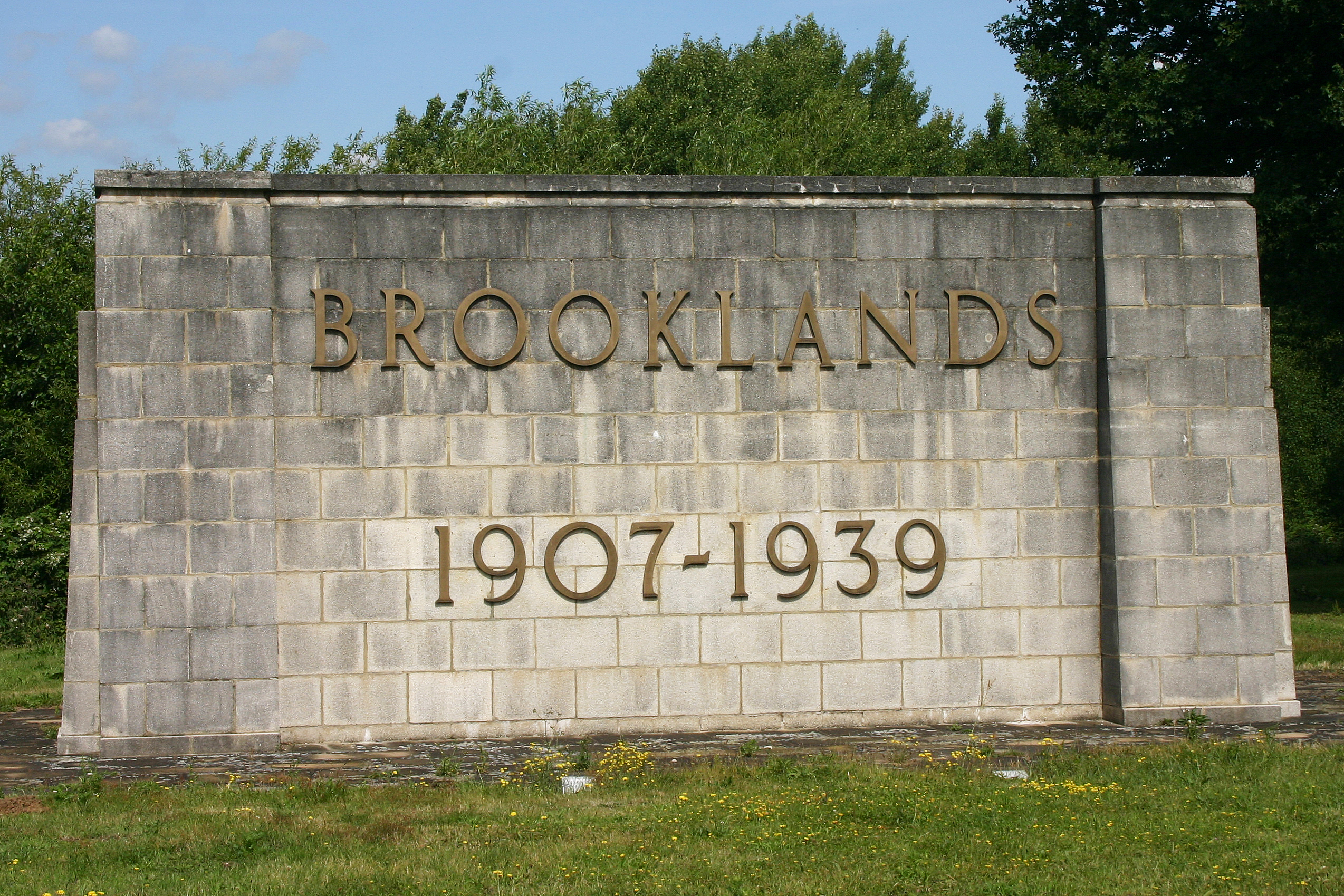
The Brooklands Memorial

On 6 July 1957, the Brooklands Memorial was unveiled by Lord Brabazon of Tara, at an event organised by Vickers-Armstrongs to mark the 50th anniversary of the opening of Brooklands motor course. A rally, organised by Godalming & District Round Table, took place at the site in June 1967 for the circuit's diamond jubilee. The latter event was a catalyst for the formation of the Brooklands Society, whose objects were to promote interest in Brooklands (for both its motoring and aviation influences) and to preserve what remained of the track and infrastructure.

A further rally to celebrate the 70th anniversary of the opening of the track took place in June 1977. The same year, the Brooklands Society obtained outline planning consent for a museum on a 40 acres (16 ha) portion of the site, but lacked the funds to acquire the land and pursue its plans. In 1978, much of the circuit was cleared and many of the historic buildings, with the exception of the 1932 Aero Clubhouse and the 1911 ticket office, were demolished. At the end of the decade, the western side of the circuit was developed into an industrial estate.

=== Acquisition of the site and opening of the museum ===
In 1982, the land that would become the site of the future Brooklands Museum was purchased by the tobacco company, Gallaher Ltd. The company retained 10 acres (4.0 ha) for an office building, but, in 1984, leased the remaining 30 acres (12 ha) to Elmbridge Borough Council for the purpose of founding a museum. Gallaher Ltd pledged £1.5 million to restore the clubhouse, but at the same time a further 300 m (980 ft) section of the banked part of the track was destroyed.

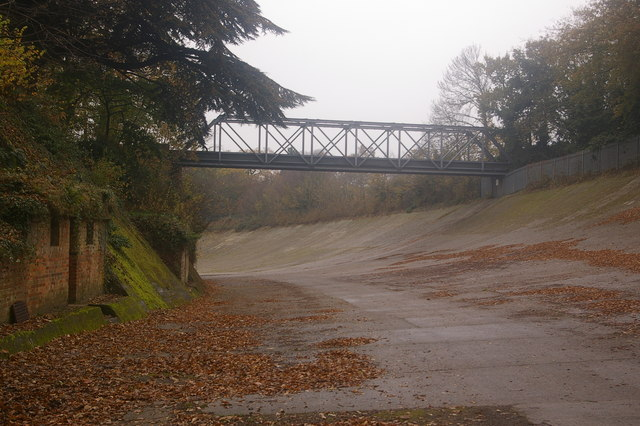
The rebuilt Members Bridge over the northern part of the track

Restoration work began in the mid-1980s and Brooklands Museum Trust Ltd was formed in early 1987. The trust was formally launched on 7 June that year, for the circuit's 80th anniversary, and the first chairman was Sir Peter Masefield. Morag Barton was appointed the first museum director in August 1987 (Note: In the 2002 New Year's Honours List, Morag Barton was awarded an MBE in recognition of her services to the Brooklands Museum Trust.) and reconstruction of the Members Bridge began in October 1988. The 1911 ticket office was relocated to the museum site the following year.

The visitors were admitted to Brooklands Museum in the summer of 1990, but the official opening ceremony was performed by the Royal Patron, Prince Michael of Kent, on 10 April 1991.

=== 21st century ===
The museum celebrated the centenary of the opening of the Brooklands Circuit in 2007, 100 years of aviation at Brooklands in 2008 and the Test Hill's centenary in 2009.

The London Bus Museum moved to the purpose-built Cobham Hall on the Brooklands Museum site in August 2011.

== Museum site ==
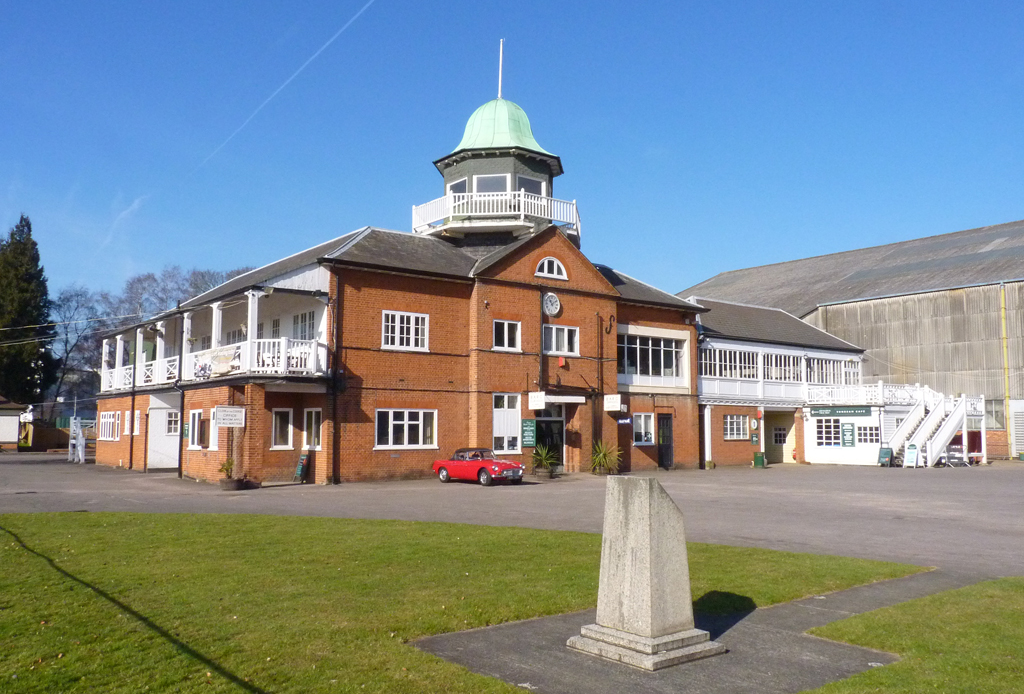
The Clubhouse

The museum is located on 30 acres (12 ha) of the original 1907 motor-racing circuit. It includes four listed buildings: the 1907 Brooklands Automobile Racing Club Clubhouse and Members' Hill Restaurant buildings, the 1911 Flight Ticket Office and a 1940 Bellman aircraft hangar. Surviving sections of the 1937 Campbell Circuit, the 1907 Finishing Straight and Members' Banking (the steepest section of the former racing circuit), the 1909 Test Hill, and a WW2 'Bofors' gun tower are part of the Brooklands Scheduled Monument which was extended in 2002. The entire Brooklands site was designated a Conservation Area in 1989.

== Collection ==
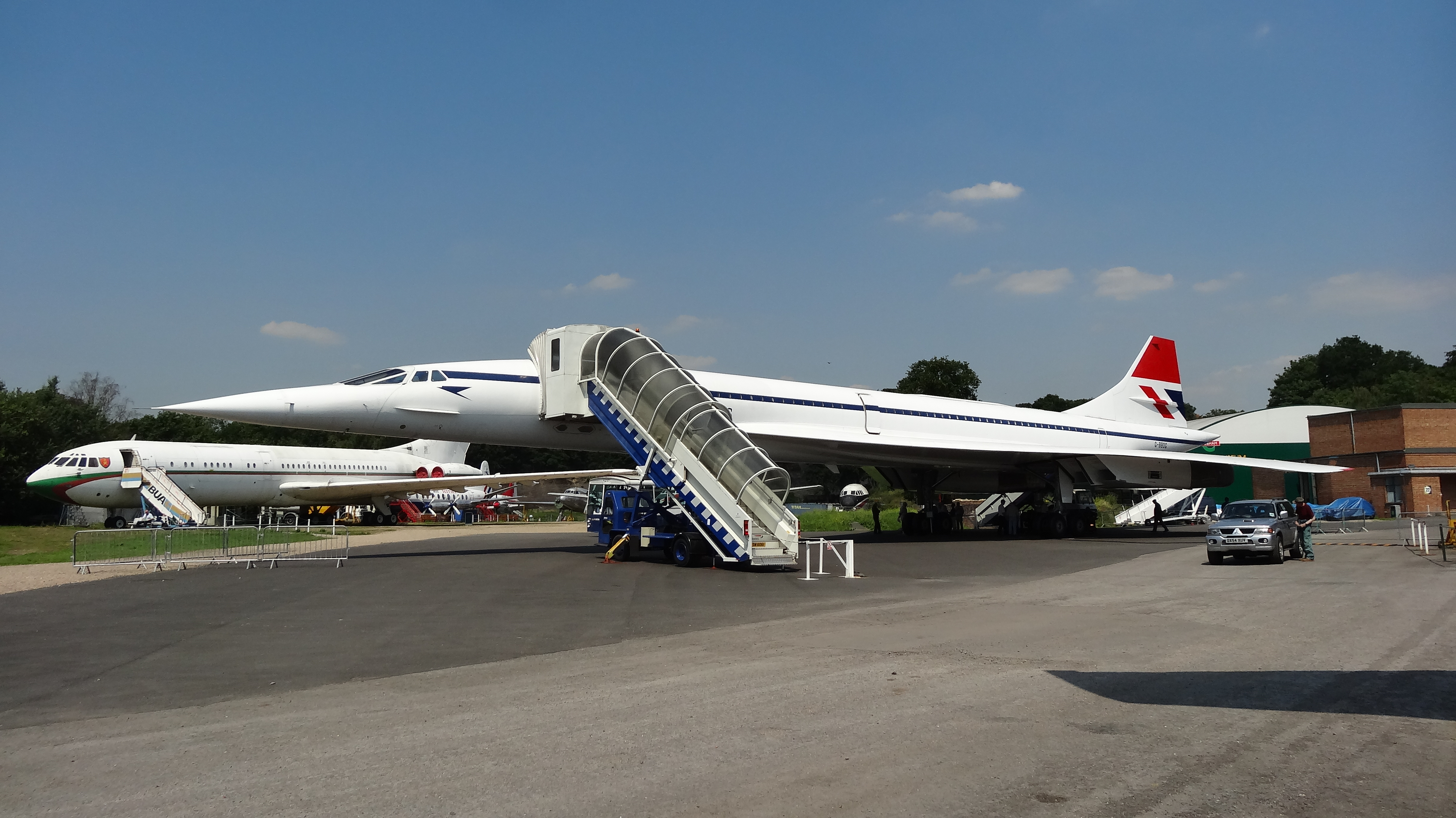
Concorde G-BBDG

The museum is open daily and displays a wide range of Brooklands-related motoring and aviation exhibits ranging from giant racing cars such as the 24-litre Napier-Railton, motorcycles, and bicycles to a unique collection of Hawker and Vickers/British Aircraft Corporation-built aircraft including Concorde (G-BBDG).

Other museum exhibits include flyable Bleriot XI and Sopwith Camel replicas built by Mike Beach and Viv Bellamy, respectively. The Camel is maintained in 'live' condition and performs regular engine running demonstrations at museum events during the year. A Grand Prix motor racing exhibition which features a Formula One simulator can also be seen. A major new visitor attraction, 'The Concorde Experience', opened in August 2006, centenary celebrations occurred in 2007 and a full-size modern working replica of Alliott Verdon Roe's 1908 'Avroplane' was completed and unveiled on 7 June 2008.

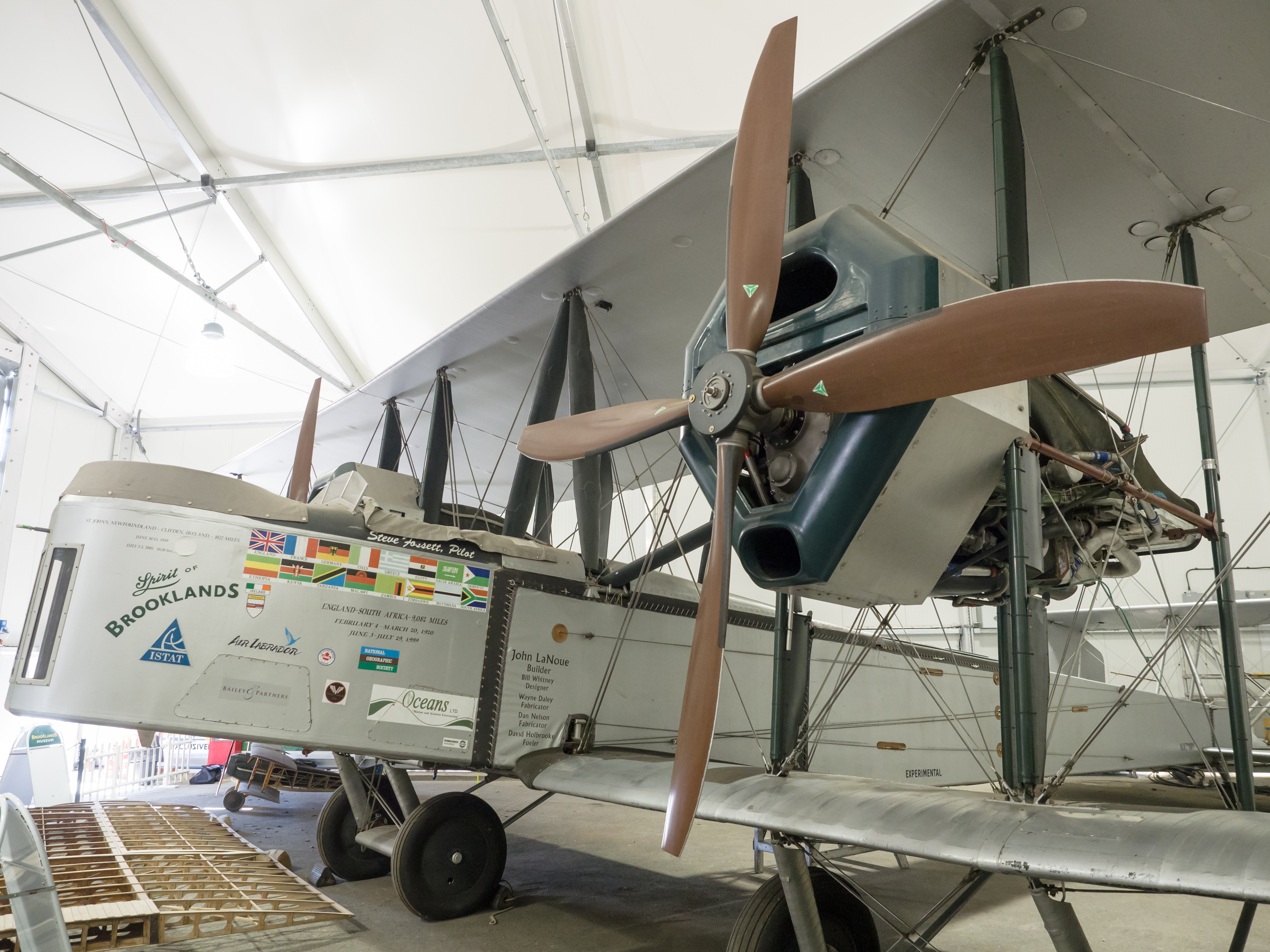
Vickers Vimy replica at Brooklands Museum

The museum also owns and, until late 2009, operated an airworthy Vickers Vimy replica which was built in America in 1994 to re-enact the design's three record-breaking long-distance flights of 1919–20. Having helped commemorate the 90th anniversaries of the world's first transatlantic flight and the first flight from England to Australia, the aeroplane was finally retired and flown into Brooklands on 15 November 2009. In 2016, it was relocated to the purpose-built Vimy Pavilion where it is now kept maintained 'live' condition and performs occasional engine running demonstrations on the race track.

In early 2011 the museum received on loan from its owners the historic fuselage of the Supermarine Swift F.4 prototype, WK198, which held the World Absolute Air Speed Record when flown by test pilot Mike Lithgow in Libya on 26 September 1953.

A temporary exhibition about Brooklands in the Battle of Britain was unveiled on 15 September 2010. Centred on a restored Hawker Hurricane, it explained how the aircraft factories made the site a prime target for the Luftwaffe. The exhibition listed the names of those killed when Vickers was badly bombed on 4 September 1940.

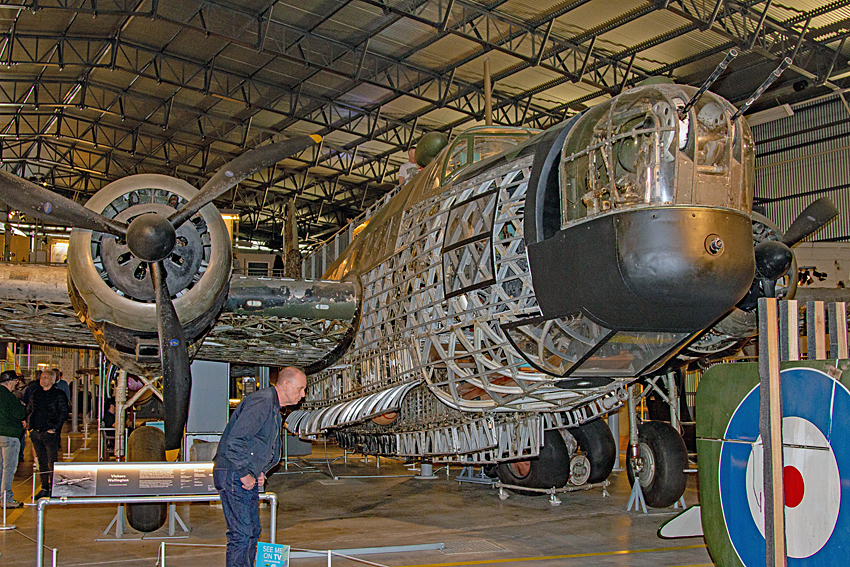
Loch Ness Wellington at Brooklands

Another new temporary exhibition about the Vickers Wellington was centred on the Loch Ness Wellington and was opened by Robin Holmes, Penelope Keith, Norman Parker and Ken Wallis on 15 June 2011 – the 75th anniversary of the first flight of the type's forerunner, prototype Vickers B.9/32.

In 2012, the 50th anniversary of the Vickers VC10 airliner was marked by the staging of a VC10 Symposium and the official opening of a new VC10 exhibition by the late Sir George Edwards' daughter Angela Newton on 29 June – half a century after the aircraft was first flown there by Jock Bryce, Brian Trubshaw and Bill Cairns.

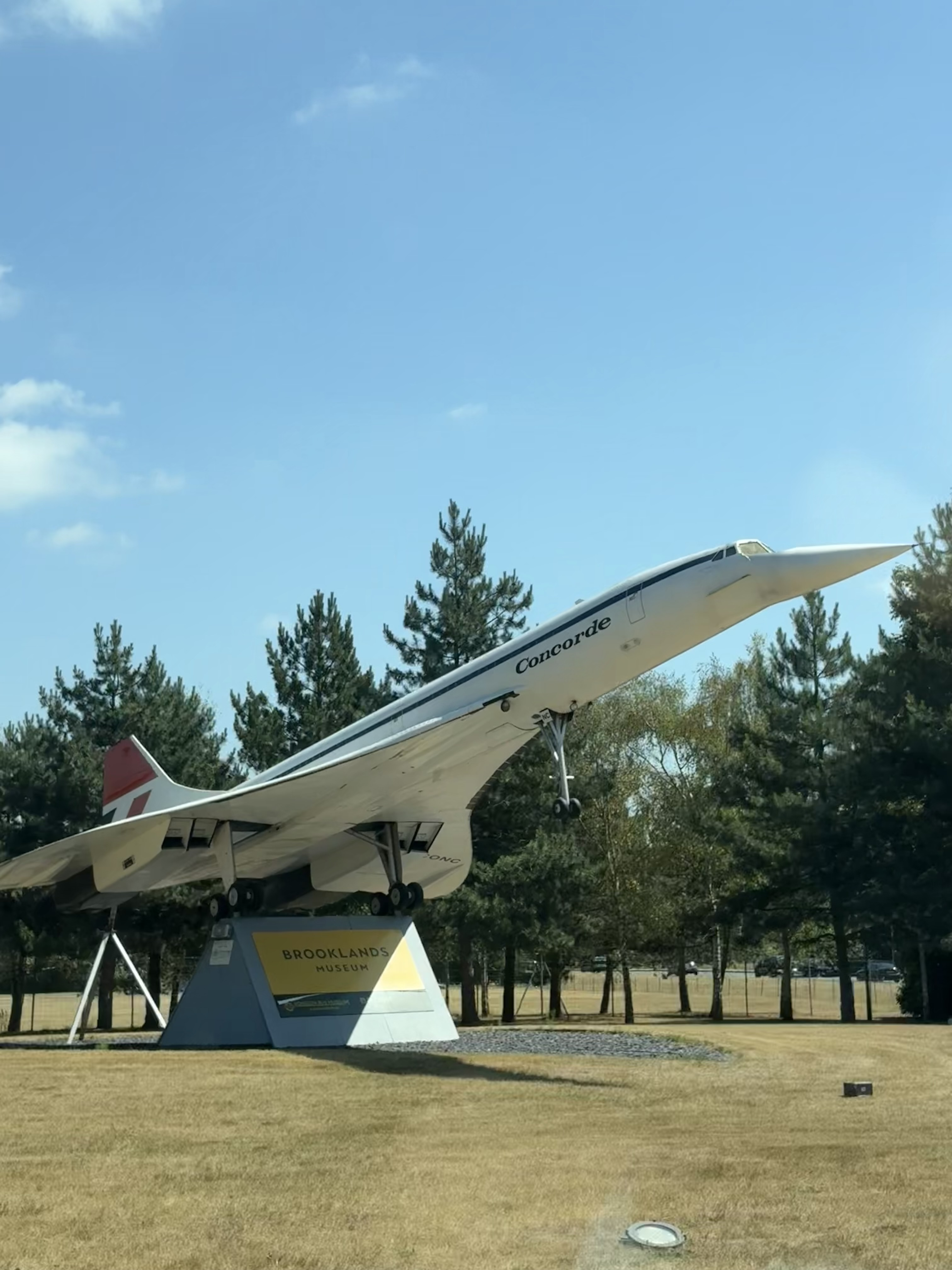
The 40% scale model of Concorde outside Brooklands Museum, reg. no. G-CONC

In late 2012, the ex-British Airways/Heathrow Airport 40% scale Concorde model G-CONC was moved to the south end of Brooklands Drive, where it now marks the main entrance to Brooklands Museum.

The Brooklands contribution to the Royal Air Force's legendary 617 Squadron 'Dambusters' attack on Germany's Ruhr Valley reservoirs on 16–17 May 1943 was commemorated on 12 May 2013 by three impressive flypasts of Brooklands Museum given by the RAF Battle of Britain Memorial Flight's Avro Lancaster – as a special 70th anniversary tribute to Barnes Wallis and the Vickers-Armstrong engineers who developed the Upkeep bouncing bomb.

The museum also owns the only complete surviving Vickers Vanguard, a Type 953C Merchantman, donated by Hunting Cargo Airlines in 1995, registration G-APEP.

The museum's aviation exhibits include a 1914 Sopwith Schneider floatplane replica, built by volunteers at Brooklands and funded by the Kingston Aviation Heritage Trust who donated it to the museum in November 2013. A 1961 BAC/Hunting Percival Jet Provost T.3A was loaned by Brooklands College 2014 and was sold to Everett Aero, Sproughton, in 2019. Prototype Beagle 206X G-ARRM recently returned to Brooklands for the first time since 1994 having been loaned to Farnborough Aviation Museum from 2011 to 2017.

In February 2015, the museum secured a £4.681 million grant from the Heritage Lottery Fund towards a £7 million Brooklands Aircraft Factory and Race-Track Revival Project. This major scheme involved dismantling, fully restoring and relocating the 1940 Bellman Hangar away from the Race Track, building an adjacent two-storey Flight Shed with stores and workshop on the ground floor and restoring the north end of Finishing Straight. The latter was completed in June 2017, in time for the 110th anniversary of the track opening and the rest of the project was finished and officially opened as the Brooklands Aircraft Factory by Prince Michael of Kent on 13 November 2017.

== Supporters' organisation ==
The Brooklands Trust Members, formed in 2008 after the Friends of Brooklands Museum and the Brooklands Club amalgamated, is the official supporters' organisation for the museum.

== London Bus Museum ==
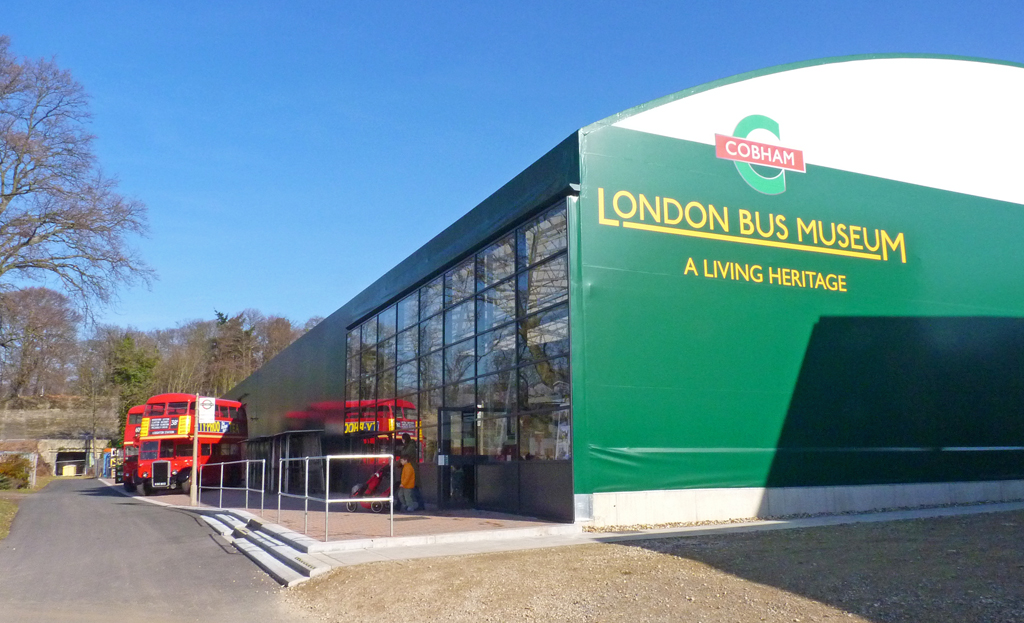
London Bus Museum

In August 2011, the new London Bus Museum opened in new premises on land at Brooklands Museum. Formerly the private Cobham Bus Museum from 1972 to 2011, LBM is itself an Accredited Museum (provisional), displaying some 35 historic London buses dating back to the 1870s, together with associated artefacts, and is run by the London Bus Preservation Trust, a registered charity. Entry to London Bus Museum is on a joint ticket with Brooklands Museum with one admission charge covering both museums.

== See also ==
- List of aerospace museums
- List of automotive museums
- List of transport museums
- List of museums in Surrey
