= Watts Gallery =

Art gallery in Compton, Surrey, England

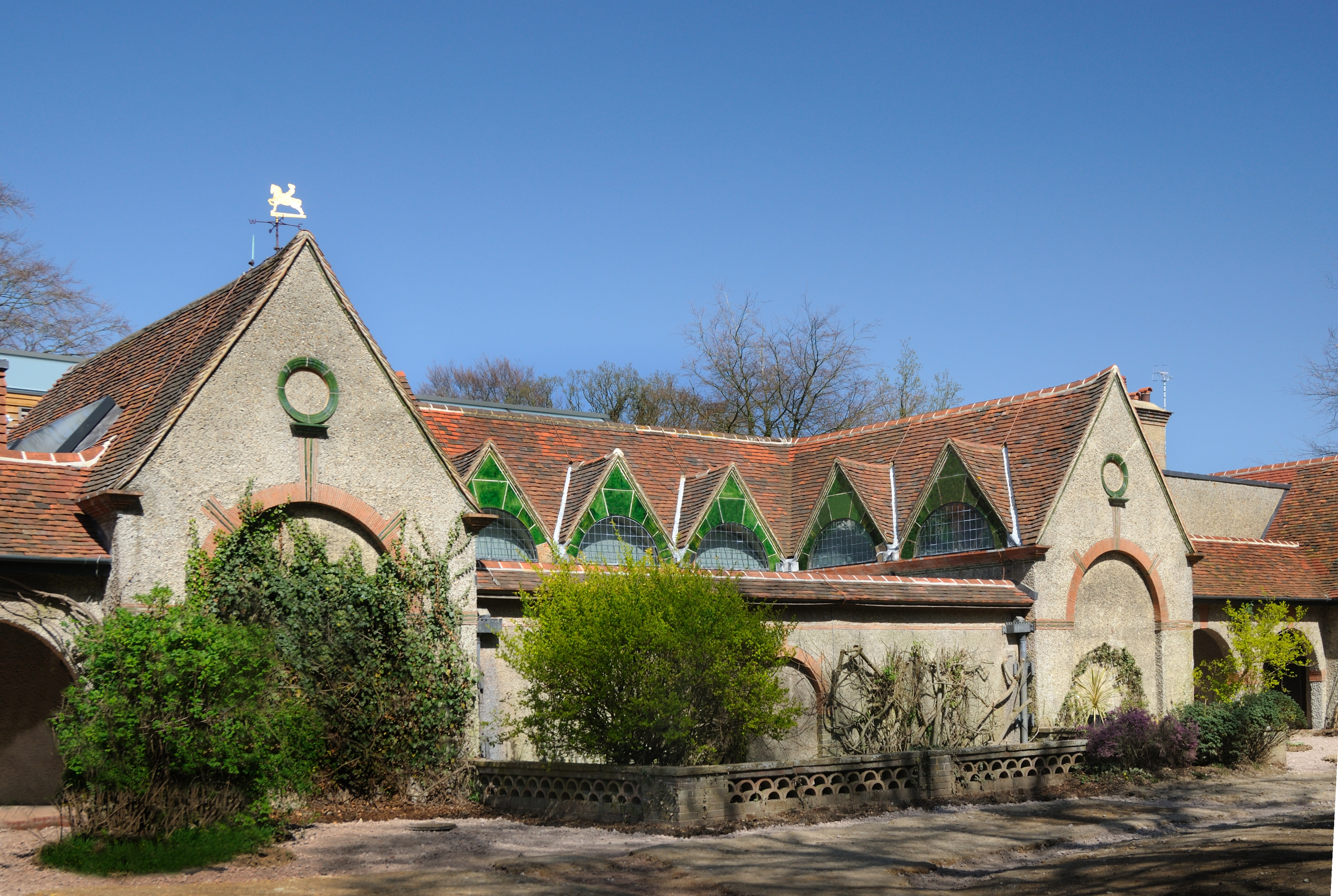
- Watts Gallery (restored)

- Location within Surrey
- Location: Compton, Surrey
- Coordinates: 51°13′17″N 0°37′45″W
- Owner: Watts Gallery Trust
- Type: Art gallery
- Event: Single artist

Construction
- Built: 1903
- Opened: 1 April 1904
- Expanded: 1906
- Architect: Christopher Hatton Turnor

Listed Building – Grade II*
- Designated: 4 June 1975
- Reference no.: 1188403

Website
- www.wattsgallery.org.uk

Watts Gallery is an art gallery in the village of Compton, near Guildford in Surrey. The 18 acre site includes a collection of buildings, including the home and artist studio of Victorian-era painter and sculptor George Frederic Watts and artist and designer Mary Watts.

The gallery has been Grade II* listed on the National Heritage List for England since June 1975.

== History ==
Watts moved to "Limnerslease" in Compton in 1891, and with his artist wife, Mary Fraser-Tytler, planned a museum devoted to his work, which opened in April 1904, just before his death.

The architect of the Gallery was Christopher Hatton Turnor, an admirer of Edwin Lutyens and C.F.A. Voysey. Inspired by the Arts and Crafts movement, the building contains top-lit galleries that allow Watts's work to be displayed under natural light.

It is one of only a few galleries in the UK devoted to a single artist and is often hailed as a national gallery in the heart of a village. Former curators include Rowland Alston, Wilfrid Blunt, Richard Jefferies, Nicholas Tromans, Mark Bills and Dr Cicely Robinson. Watts Gallery is a registered charity under English law.

In January 2008, it was announced that the Gallery intended to deaccession and sell two Victorian paintings, Sleeping Woman (1880) by Albert Joseph Moore and Triumph of Love (1871) by Edward Burne-Jones, which had both been bequeathed to the collection by Cecil French. These were duly sold. The money was used to maintain the Gallery which was closed from September 2008 until 2010 for restoration.

In December 2006, Watts Gallery received a £4.3 million grant from the Heritage Lottery Fund for renovations to help safeguard the future of the building and its collections.

Watts Gallery reopened in June 2011 after a major scheme of works, including extension, refurbishment and restoration. Visitors can now experience the Watts collection in the historic galleries displaying the original decorative schemes.

Over one-hundred paintings by G. F. Watts are on permanent display at the Gallery. Spanning a period of 70 years they include portraits, landscapes and his major symbolic works. From the dramatic entrance of the Livanos Gallery to the monumental sculpture and studio artefacts in the Sculpture Gallery, Watts Gallery shows the collection left by the artist as his legacy.

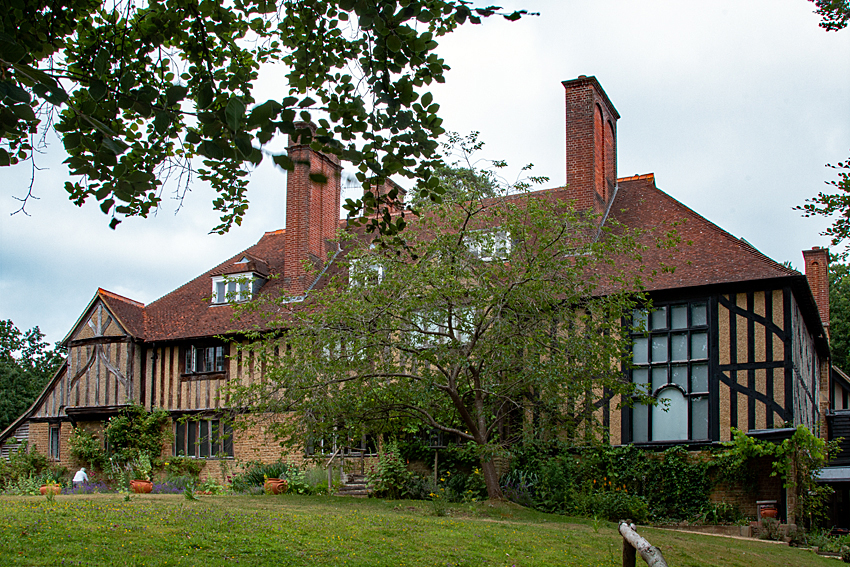
Limnerslease

In January 2016, Watts Gallery opened the newly renovated "Limnerslease", the former home and studio of G. F. and Mary Watts, completing the Artists' Village.

Compton's burial ground, nearby, houses Watts' remains and is dominated by the ornate Arts & Crafts Watts Mortuary Chapel, designed by Watts' wife Mary, also run by the museum.

In 2017, Surrey County Council was the subject of some controversy when it agreed to provide a grant to the gallery of £100,000 per annum over 4 years to make up for loss of grants from elsewhere, at a time when the council were making cuts of £34 million to local services.

== In popular culture ==
Watts Gallery was placed second in the final of the BBC TV series Restoration Village in 2006.

== De Morgan Foundation ==
Following the closure of the De Morgan Centre, London, in the summer of 2014, the Watts Gallery and the De Morgan Foundation, a registered charity preserving the work of William De Morgan and Evelyn De Morgan, entered into a collaboration which saw the opening of a long term exhibition in the Richard Jeffries Gallery in the main gallery building. This exhibition includes a number of key works from the De Morgan Collection.

== Collection ==
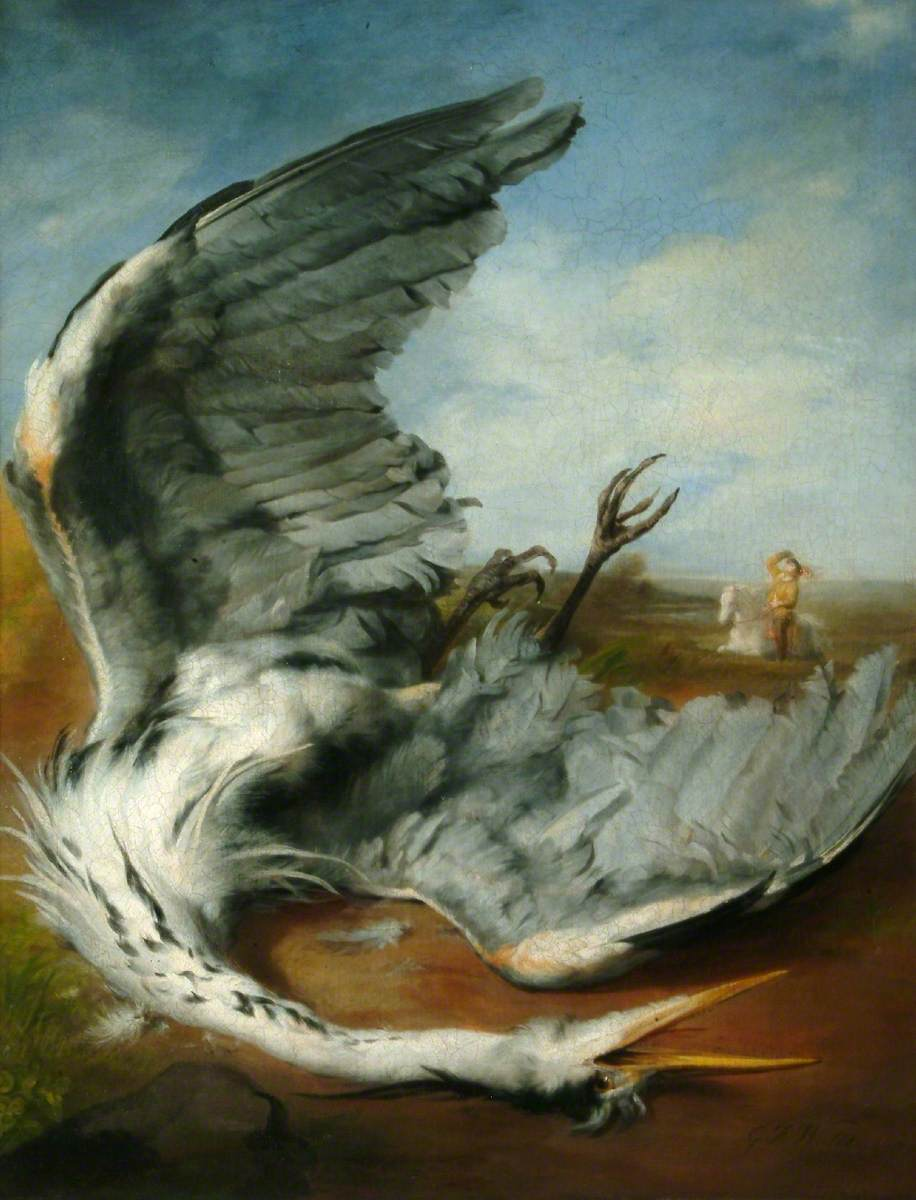
The Wounded Heron, 1837

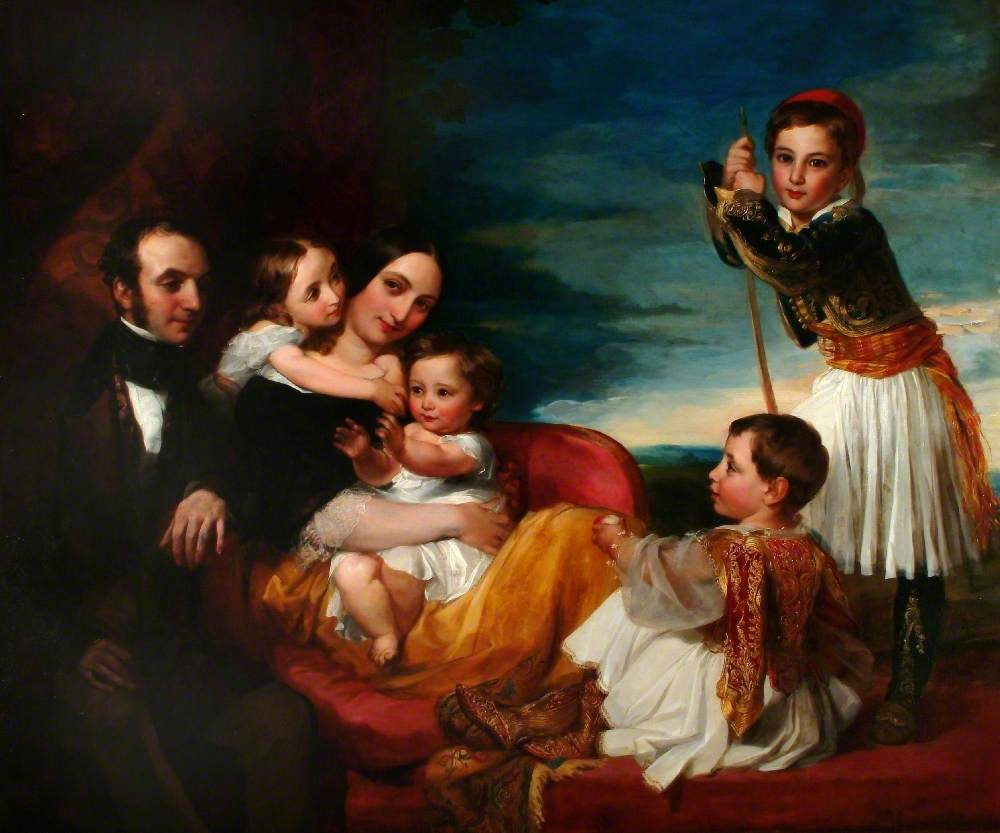
The Ionides Family c.1840

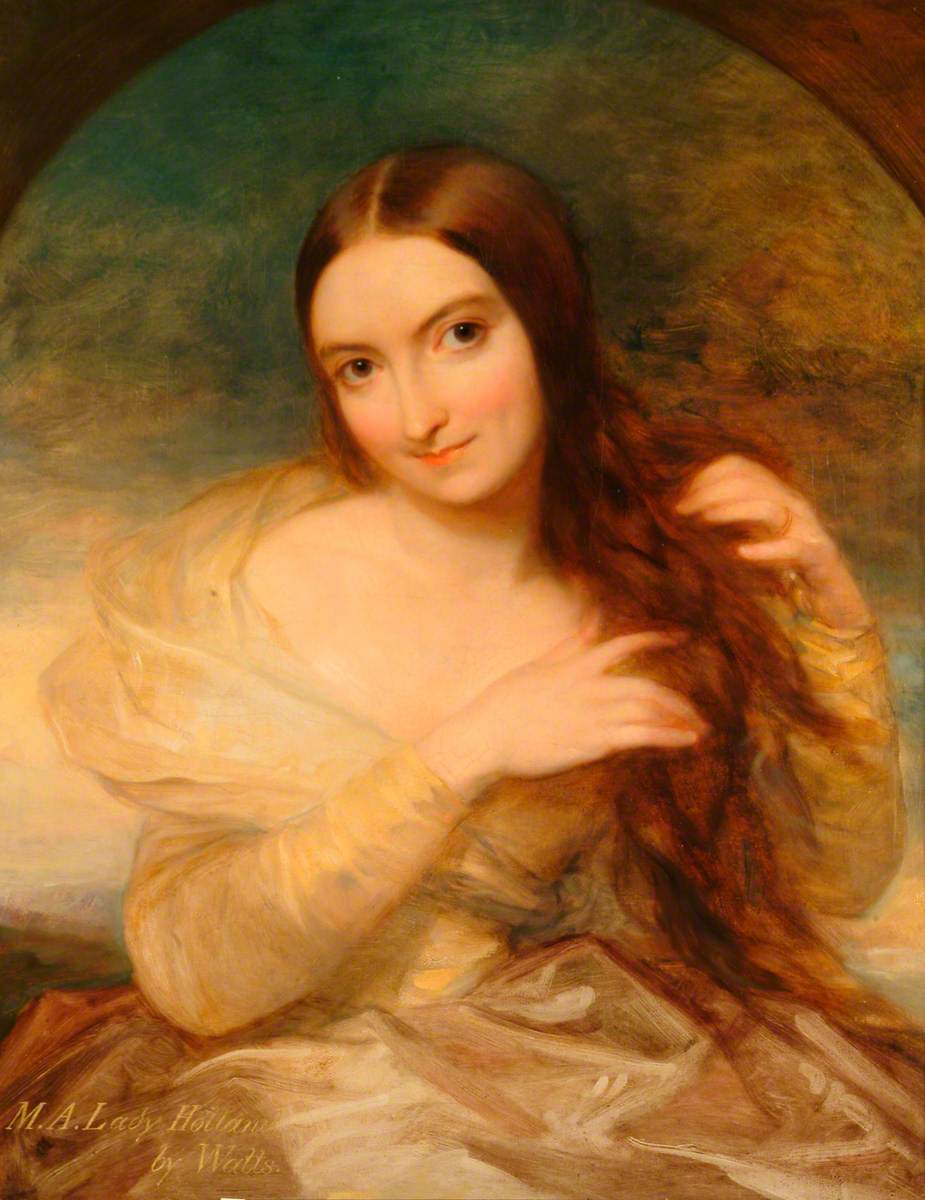
Portrait of Lady Holland, 1844

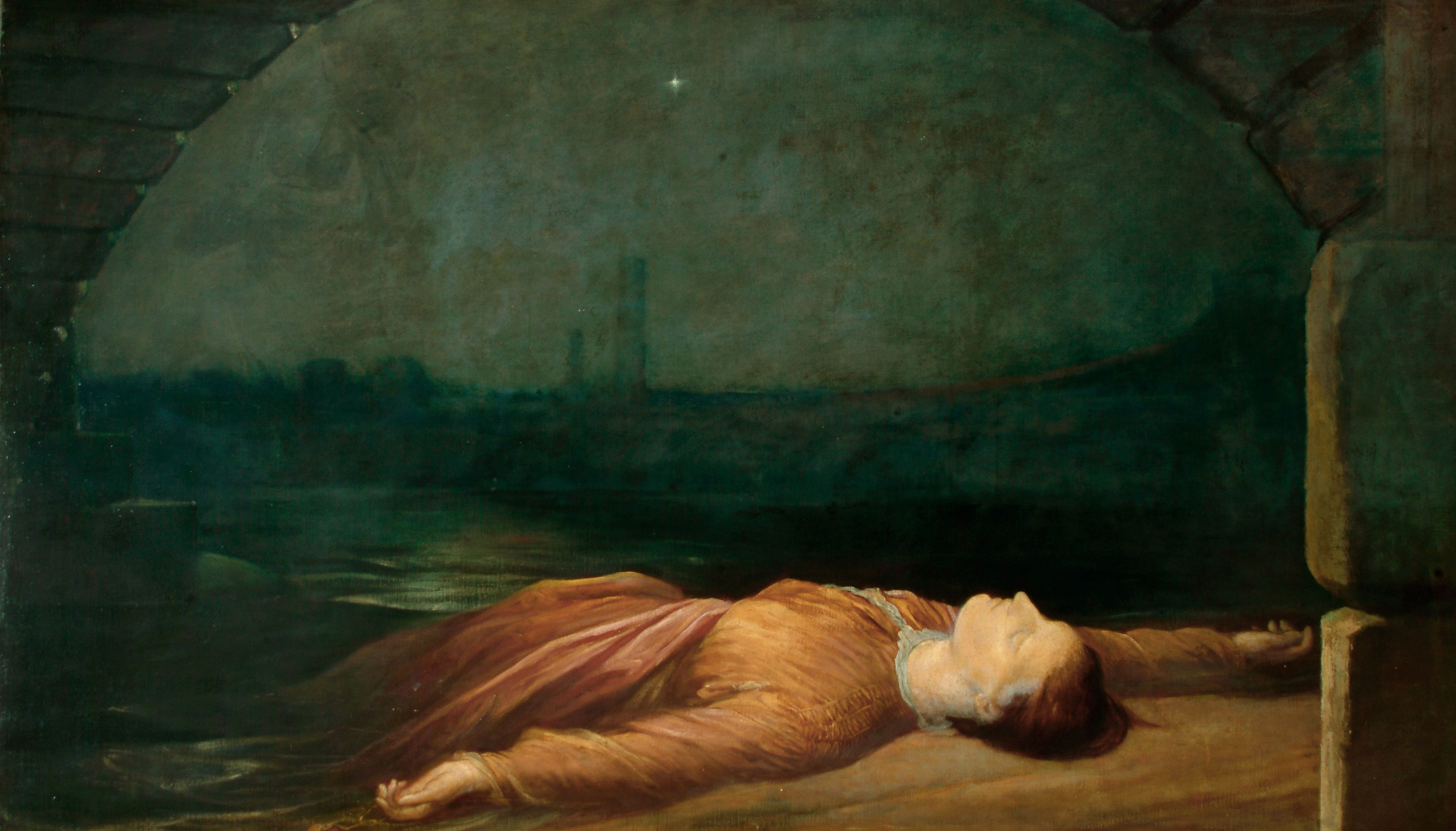
Found Drowned, 1850

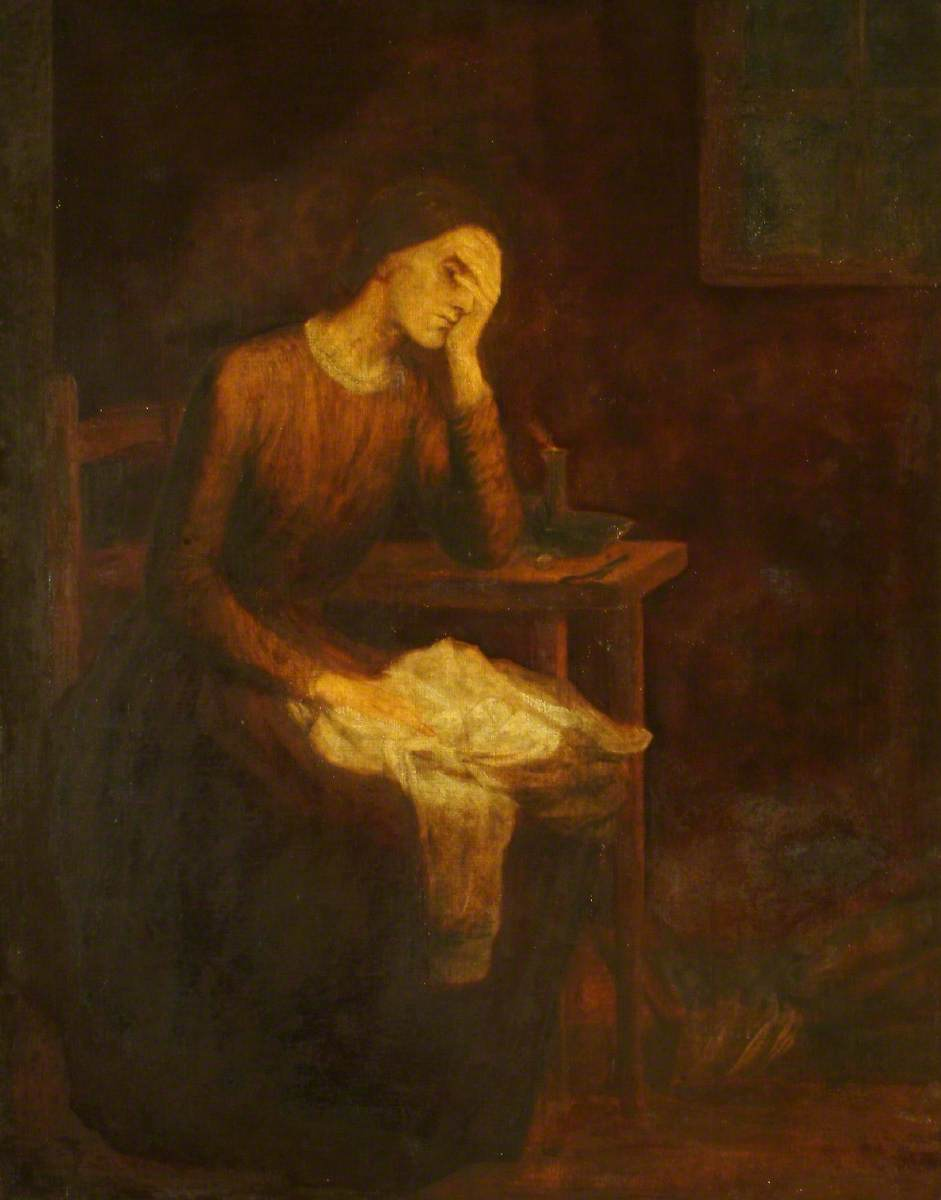
Song of the Shirt, 1850

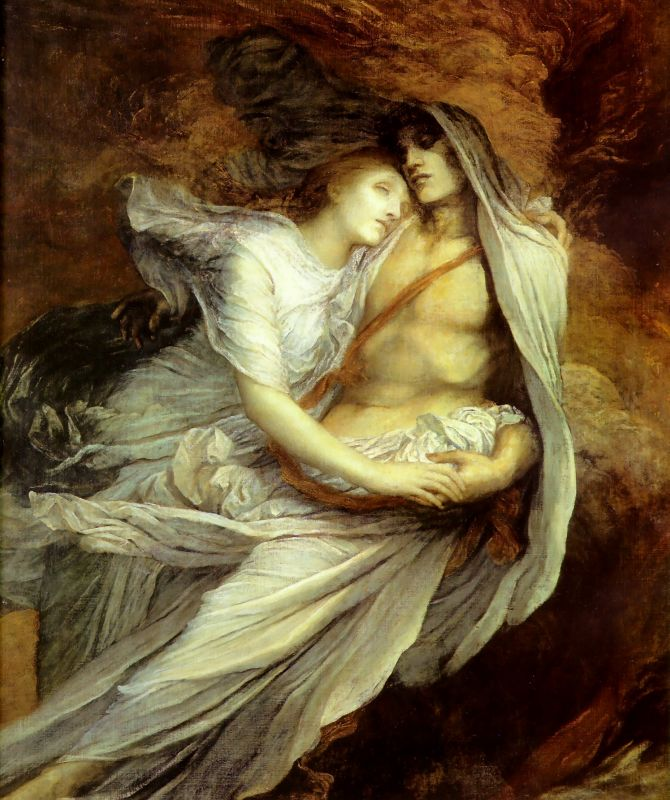
Paolo and Francesca, 1872

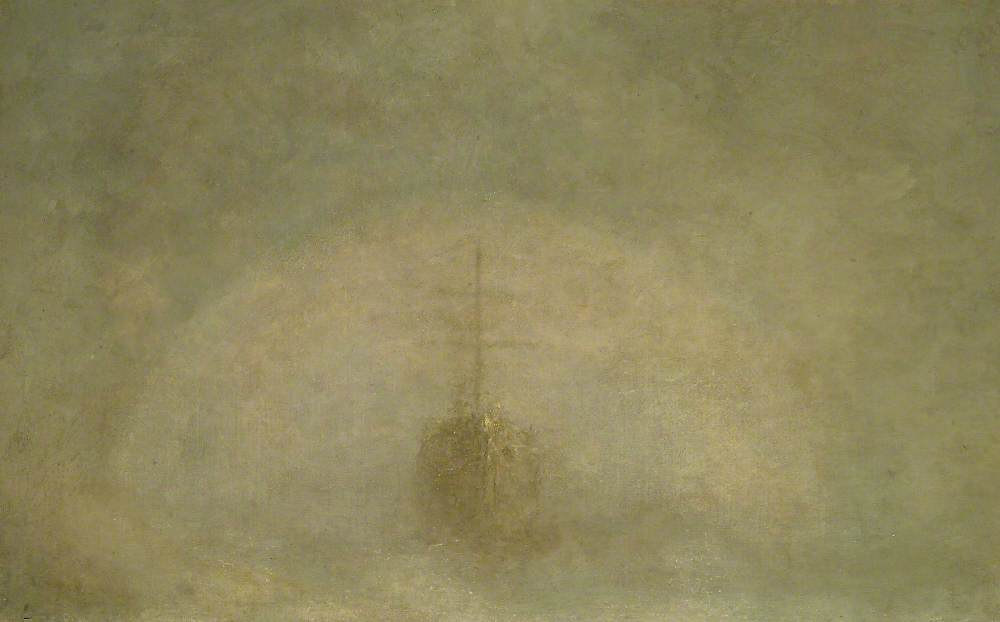
A Sea Ghost, 1887

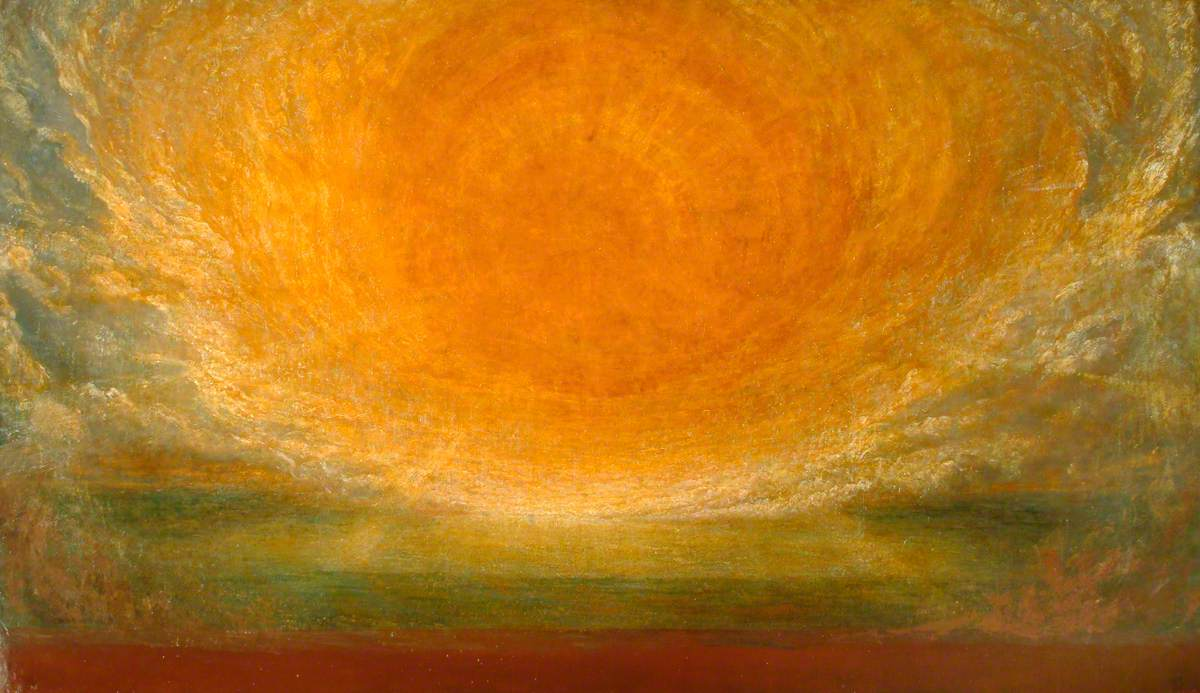
After the Deluge, 1891

== See also ==
- List of single-artist museums
