= Godalming Museum =

Local museum in Surrey

Coordinates: 51°11′07″N 0°36′56″W

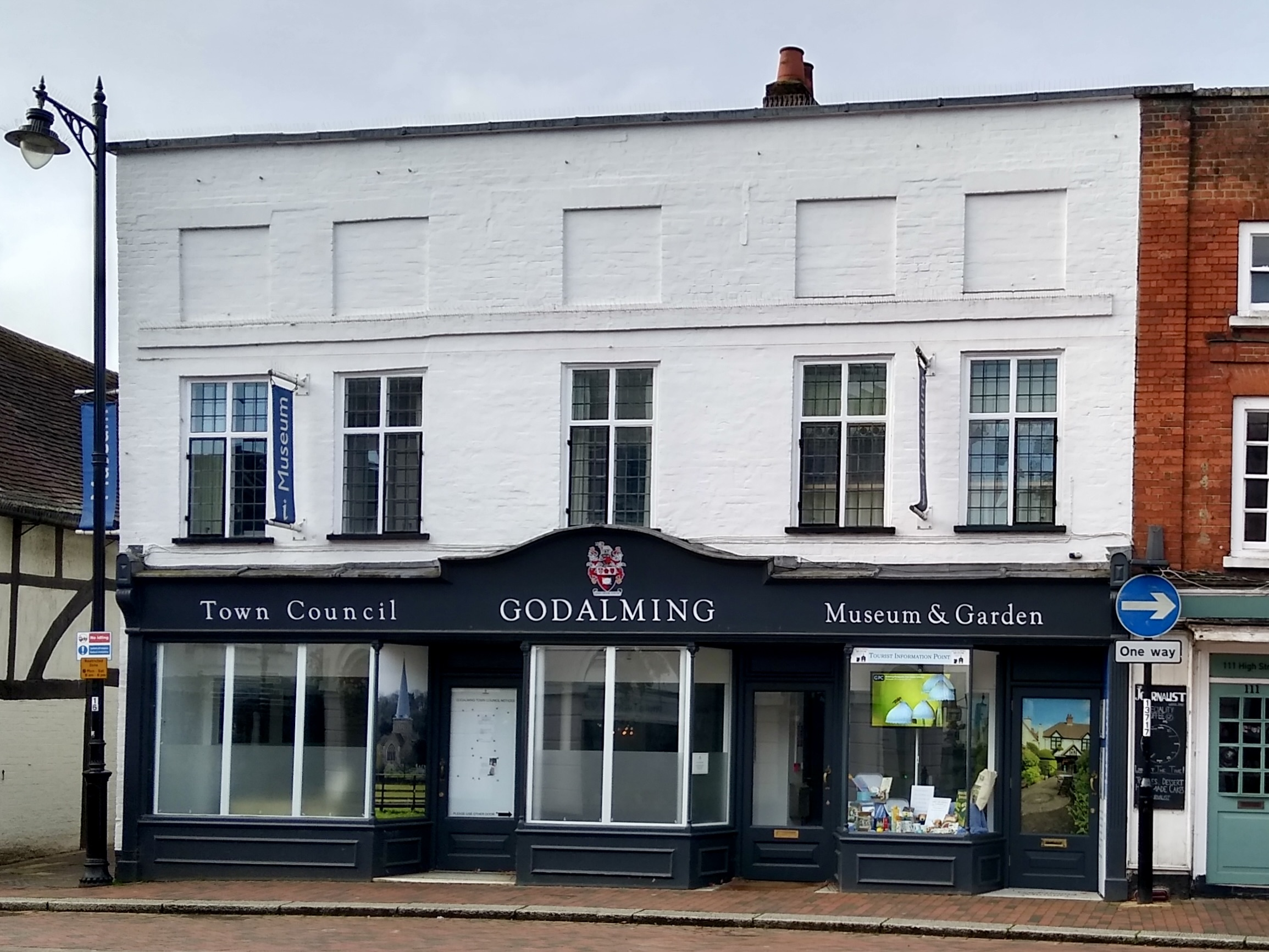
- Location: Godalming
- Type: Local museum
- Accreditation: Arts Council England
- Public transit access: Godalming railway station
- Parking: South Street
- Website: godalmingmuseum.co.uk

Godalming Museum is a local museum in the town of Godalming, Surrey, England.

The museum covers the local history of the town and the surrounding area. The collections include paintings, ceramics, embroidery and architectural designs. The museum has works by watercolourist Helen Allingham, watercolourist and engraver Myles Birket Foster, the garden designer Gertrude Jekyll, the architect Sir Edwin Lutyens, the landscape watercolourist and etcher Percy Robertson, and architect and china painter Hugh Thackeray Turner.

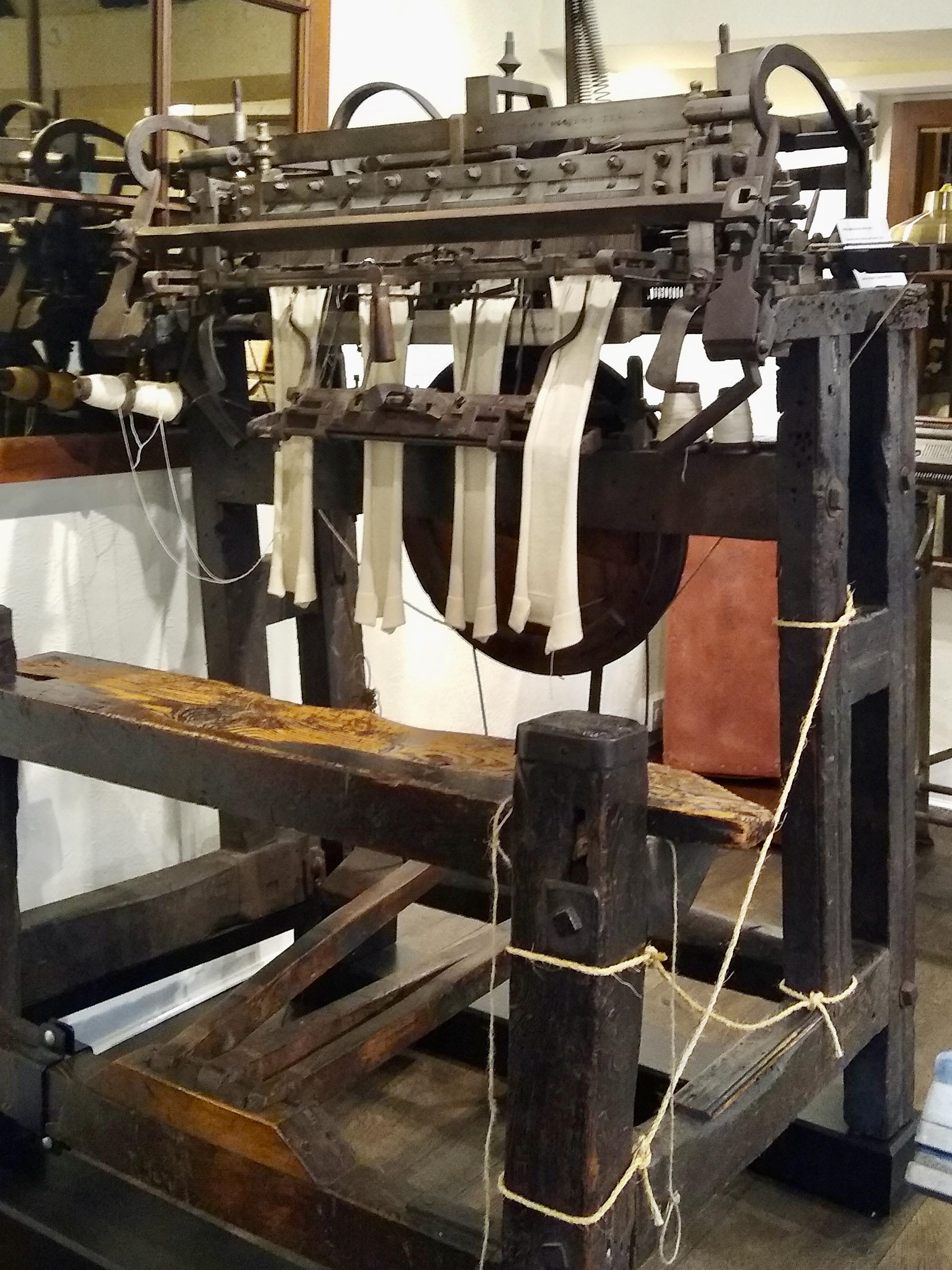
Stocking frame

Among the items on display is a stocking frame, donated to the museum in 1936 by Allen, Solly and Company of Arnold, Nottinghamshire. The firm operated in Godalming between 1860 and 1888.

== See also ==
- List of museums in Surrey
