= Grade I listed buildings in Surrey =

Surrey shown within England

There are over six thousand Grade I listed buildings, the highest designation, in England. The 105 in the county of Surrey are presented here, ordered by district. Of the eleven districts comprising Surrey, Epsom and Ewell is the only one that has none. A notable group are a 13th century set of four bridges, sponsored by Waverley Abbey; Tilford, Elstead and Eashing bridges.

There are also nine Grade I listed parks and gardens in Surrey; not listed here.

== Elmbridge ==
Name	Location	Type	Completed (Note: The date given is the date used by Historic England as significant for the initial building or that of an important part in the structure's description.)	Date designated	Grid ref. (Note: The grid reference is based on the British national grid reference system, sometimes known as OSGB36, used by the Ordnance Survey.) Geo-coordinates	Entry number (Note: The "List Entry Number" is a unique number assigned to each listed building and scheduled monument by Historic England.)	Image
Church of St Andrew	Cobham	Church	12th century	14 August 1953	TQ1078659743; 51°19′34″N 0°24′41″W	1188115	Church of St Andrew More images
Church of St George	Esher	Church	1540	14 August 1953	TQ1394664623; 51°22′09″N 0°21′52″W	1030218	Church of St George More images
Church of St Mary	Stoke D'Abernon	Church	Late 7th century	14 August 1953	TQ1291958444; 51°18′50″N 0°22′52″W	1030111	Church of St Mary More images
Church of St Mary	Walton-on-Thames	Church	13th century	19 October 1951	TQ1020066526; 51°23′14″N 0°25′04″W	1030224	Church of St Mary More images
Church of St Nicholas	Thames Ditton	Church	13th century	16 November 1984	TQ1609767265; 51°23′33″N 0°19′58″W	1188441	Church of St Nicholas More images
Claremont House	Esher	Country House	1770	14 August 1953	TQ1342863328; 51°21′28″N 0°22′20″W	1030202	Claremont House More images
Old Manor House	Walton on Thames	Manor House	1310	19 October 1951	TQ0988466687; 51°23′19″N 0°25′20″W	1030163	Old Manor House More images
Wayneflete Tower	Esher	Gatehouse	1475–80	14 August 1953	TQ1307965103; 51°22′25″N 0°22′36″W	1286940	Wayneflete Tower More images

== Guildford ==
Name	Location	Type	Completed	Date designated	Grid ref. Geo-coordinates	Entry number	Image
Old St Peter and St Paul's Church, Albury	Albury	Parish Church	14th century	14 June 1967	TQ0632047848; 51°13′12″N 0°28′44″W	1294958	Old St Peter and St Paul's Church, Albury More images
Chapel of St Catherine	Artington	Chapel	Early 14th century	14 June 1967	SU9934348190; 51°13′27″N 0°34′44″W	1377750	Chapel of St Catherine More images
Loseley House	Artington	Country House	1562–1569	18 February 1958	SU9749547149; 51°12′55″N 0°36′20″W	1029573	Loseley House More images
Church of St Nicholas	Compton	Church	11th century	14 June 1967	SU9544547021; 51°12′52″N 0°38′06″W	1188621	Church of St Nicholas More images
Watts Mortuary Chapel	Compton	Chapel	1896–1898	14 June 1967	SU9563147397; 51°13′04″N 0°37′56″W	1029541	Watts Mortuary Chapel More images
Church of St Thomas of Canterbury	East Clandon	Church	13th century	14 June 1967	TQ0601751736; 51°15′18″N 0°28′56″W	1029446	Church of St Thomas of Canterbury More images
Hatchlands Park	East Clandon	Country House	1756-7	14 June 1967	TQ0673352009; 51°15′26″N 0°28′19″W	1294970	Hatchlands Park More images
Church of All Saints	Ockham	Church	14th century	14 June 1967	TQ0665056538; 51°17′53″N 0°28′18″W	1188424	Church of All Saints More images
Newark Priory	Ripley	Priory	13th century	14 June 1967	TQ0417257699; 51°18′32″N 0°30′25″W	1377835	Newark Priory More images
Eashing Bridge	Lower Eashing, Shackleford	Bridge	13th century	14 June 1967	SU9466843811; 51°11′09″N 0°38′49″W	1377743	Eashing Bridge More images
Church of St Mary	Holmbury St Mary, Shere	Church	1879	14 June 1967	TQ1098944426; 51°11′18″N 0°24′48″W	1029485	Church of St Mary More images
Holmdale	Holmbury St Mary, Shere	Country House	1873	14 June 1967	TQ1107343800; 51°10′58″N 0°24′44″W	1029481	Upload Photo
Church of St James	Shere	Church	12th century	14 June 1967	TQ0743647781; 51°13′09″N 0°27′47″W	1377794	Church of St James More images
Church of St Bartholomew	Wanborough	Church	12th-century origin	14 June 1967	SU9349048903; 51°13′54″N 0°39′45″W	1287038	Church of St Bartholomew More images
Clandon Park	West Clandon	Country House	1725-31	14 June 1967	TQ0421051218; 51°15′02″N 0°30′30″W	1294591	Clandon Park More images
Church of St Mary the Virgin	West Horsley	Church	12th century	14 June 1967	TQ0883352643; 51°15′45″N 0°26′30″W	1377828	Church of St Mary the Virgin More images
West Horsley Place	West Horsley	House	Early 17th century	14 June 1967	TQ0880053011; 51°15′57″N 0°26′31″W	1188949	West Horsley Place More images
Wisley Church	Wisley	Church	12th century	14 June 1967	TQ0568759610; 51°19′33″N 0°29′04″W	1294423	Wisley Church More images
Church of St Mary the Virgin	Worplesdon	Church	13th century	14 June 1967	SU9729253574; 51°16′23″N 0°36′24″W	1377735	Church of St Mary the Virgin More images
Church of Holy Trinity	Guildford	Church	c. 1540	1 May 1953	SU9988149499; 51°14′09″N 0°34′15″W	1029258	Church of Holy Trinity More images
Church of St Mary	Guildford	Church	c. 1040	1 May 1953	SU9961449344; 51°14′05″N 0°34′28″W	1377918	Church of St Mary More images
Former royal apartments at Guildford Castle	Guildford	Castle	Late 12th century	1 May 1953	SU9972049256; 51°14′02″N 0°34′23″W	1029306	Former royal apartments at Guildford Castle More images
Guildford Castle Keep	Guildford	Castle	Mid-12th century	1 May 1953	SU9976849312; 51°14′03″N 0°34′21″W	1377881	Guildford Castle Keep More images
Remains of shell keep at Guildford Castle	Guildford	Shell Keep	Early 12th century	1 May 1953	SU9976149297; 51°14′03″N 0°34′21″W	1177988	Remains of shell keep at Guildford Castle More images
Guildford Castle gateway and walls adjoining to the east and south	Guildford	Castle	Mid-13th century	1 May 1953	SU9969649237; 51°14′01″N 0°34′24″W	1029253	Guildford Castle gateway and walls adjoining to the east and south More images
Guildford House	Guildford	Jettied House	c. 1660	1 May 1953	SU9982549515; 51°14′10″N 0°34′17″W	1180153	Guildford House More images
Hospital of the Blessed Holy Trinity	Guildford	Almshouse	1619-1622	1 May 1953	SU9986149532; 51°14′10″N 0°34′16″W	1029289	Hospital of the Blessed Holy Trinity More images
Somerset House	Guildford	Town House	Late 17th century	1 May 1953	TQ0003949602; 51°14′13″N 0°34′06″W	1029265	Somerset House More images
Guildford Grammar School	Guildford	School	1557	1 May 1953	TQ0001149575; 51°14′12″N 0°34′08″W	1294936	Guildford Grammar School More images
Guildford Guildhall	Guildford	Guildhall	c. 1550	1 May 1953	SU9976449492; 51°14′09″N 0°34′21″W	1180101	Guildford Guildhall More images

== Mole Valley ==
Name	Location	Type	Completed	Date designated	Grid ref. Geo-coordinates	Entry number	Image
Church of St Michael	Betchworth	Church	13th century	11 November 1966	TQ2105949702; 51°14′01″N 0°16′03″W	1378131	Church of St Michael More images
Church of Saint Nicholas	Charlwood	Church	15th century	11 November 1966	TQ2405041111; 51°09′21″N 0°13′39″W	1248610	Church of Saint Nicholas More images
Church of St John the Evangelist	Wotton	Church	13th century	11 November 1966	TQ1256847977; 51°13′12″N 0°23′22″W	1294098	Church of St John the Evangelist More images
Church of St Nicholas	Great Bookham	Church	15th century	7 September 1951	TQ1350454660; 51°16′47″N 0°22′26″W	1028641	Church of St Nicholas More images
Slyfield Farmhouse, with attached garden wall	Fetcham	Farmhouse	18th century	7 September 1951	TQ1332757904; 51°18′32″N 0°22′32″W	1028670	Slyfield Farmhouse, with attached garden wall More images
Slyfield Manor or House, with attached garden walls	Fetcham	House	17th century	7 September 1951	TQ1335857878; 51°18′31″N 0°22′30″W	1294510	Slyfield Manor or House, with attached garden walls More images

== Reigate and Banstead ==
Name	Location	Type	Completed	Date designated	Grid ref. Geo-coordinates	Entry number	Image
Church of St Bartholomew	Horley	Church	Early 14th century	11 November 1966	TQ2763342758; 51°10′11″N 0°10′33″W	1378035	Church of St Bartholomew More images
Church of Jesus Christ and the Wisdom of God	Lower Kingswood	Church	1891	29 September 1983	TQ2486353750; 51°16′09″N 0°12′42″W	1029052	Church of Jesus Christ and the Wisdom of God More images
Church of St Andrew	Merstham	Church	13th century	19 October 1951	TQ2753152875; 51°15′39″N 0°10′25″W	1294726	Church of St Andrew More images
Church of St Margaret	Hooley	Church	12th century	24 July 1954	TQ2833956401; 51°17′32″N 0°09′39″W	1029041	Church of St Margaret More images
Reigate Priory	Reigate	Priory	13th century	19 October 1951	TQ2531850004; 51°14′08″N 0°12′23″W	1188089	Reigate Priory More images
Tadworth Court	Tadworth	Country House	c. 1700	12 August 1983	TQ2387056468; 51°17′38″N 0°13′29″W	1029004	Tadworth Court More images

== Runnymede ==
Name	Location	Type	Completed	Date designated	Grid ref. Geo-coordinates	Entry number	Image
Former Holloway Sanatorium (Crossland House, Virginia Park)	Virginia Water	Sanatorium	1873–1885	17 November 1986	TQ0026168257; 51°24′16″N 0°33′36″W	1189632	Former Holloway Sanatorium (Crossland House, Virginia Park) More images
Great Fosters	Stroude	House	c. 1550–1600	11 July 1951	TQ0130569674; 51°25′01″N 0°32′40″W	1294166	Great Fosters More images
Founder's Building, Royal Holloway College	Englefield Green	Courtyard	1879–87	17 November 1986	SU9974870506; 51°25′29″N 0°34′00″W	1028946	Founder's Building, Royal Holloway College More images
Runnymede Park	Englefield Green	Country House	1789–92	17 November 1986	TQ0021471343; 51°25′56″N 0°33′35″W	1028921	Runnymede Park More images

== Spelthorne ==
Name	Location	Type	Completed	Date designated	Grid ref. Geo-coordinates	Entry number	Image
Church of All Saints	Laleham	Church	Norman	11 August 1952	TQ0512968878; 51°24′33″N 0°29′23″W	1298923	Church of All Saints More images
Church of St Mary	Stanwell	Church	13th century	11 August 1952	TQ0571174136; 51°27′23″N 0°28′48″W	1187042	Church of St Mary More images
Church of St Mary Magdalene	Littleton	Church	12th century	11 September 1951	TQ0706868639; 51°24′24″N 0°27′43″W	1377699	Church of St Mary Magdalene More images

== Surrey Heath ==
Name	Location	Type	Completed	Date designated	Grid ref. Geo-coordinates	Entry number	Image
Church of St Lawrence	Chobham	Church	12th century	28 February 1955	SU9738061797; 51°20′49″N 0°36′11″W	1377490	Church of St Lawrence More images

== Tandridge ==
Name	Location	Type	Completed	Date designated	Grid ref. Geo-coordinates	Entry number	Image
Brewer Street Farm House	Bletchingley	Farmhouse	16th century	11 June 1958	TQ3238851933; 51°15′04″N 0°06′16″W	1281258	Brewer Street Farm House More images
Church of St Mary the Virgin	Bletchingley	Church	11th century	11 June 1958	TQ3276450849; 51°14′29″N 0°05′58″W	1029972	Church of St Mary the Virgin More images
Pendell House	Bletchingley	House	1636	11 June 1958	TQ3151151890; 51°15′04″N 0°07′01″W	1029987	Pendell House More images
Church of St Bartholemew	Burstow	Church	12th century	11 June 1958	TQ3124041296; 51°09′21″N 0°07′29″W	1204775	Church of St Bartholemew More images
Church of St Lawrence	Caterham (Caterham-on-the-Hill)	Church	Norman	21 September 1954	TQ3358455397; 51°16′55″N 0°05′10″W	1377607	Church of St Lawrence More images
Church of St Peter and St Paul	Chaldon	Church	11th century	21 September 1954	TQ3087455694; 51°17′07″N 0°07′29″W	1029813	Church of St Peter and St Paul More images
Church of St Mary the Virgin	Farleigh, Chelsham and Farleigh	Church	c. 1100	19 November 1984	TQ3723860076; 51°19′24″N 0°01′55″W	1377637	Church of St Mary the Virgin More images
Crowhurst Place	Crowhurst	Country House	15th century	9 March 1982	TQ3864246365; 51°11′59″N 0°01′01″W	1280991	Crowhurst Place More images
Old Surrey Hall	Dormansland	Country House	15th century	9 March 1982	TQ4202039958; 51°08′29″N 0°01′44″E	1029883	Upload Photo
Church of St Nicholas	Godstone	Church	13th century	11 June 1958	TQ3572851506; 51°14′48″N 0°03′24″W	1188347	Church of St Nicholas More images
Church of St Peter	Limpsfield	Church	12th century	11 June 1958	TQ4050453238; 51°15′40″N 0°00′44″E	1188814	Church of St Peter More images
Old Court Cottage	Limpsfield	House	Late 14th century	11 June 1958	TQ4049153361; 51°15′44″N 0°00′44″E	1029729	Upload Photo
Stockenden	Limpsfield	House	16th century	11 June 1958	TQ4175150087; 51°13′57″N 0°01′44″E	1377651	Stockenden More images
Church of St Peter and St Paul	Lingfield	Church	14th century	11 June 1958	TQ3888943775; 51°10′35″N 0°00′52″W	1029906	Church of St Peter and St Paul More images
Pollard Cottage & Pollard House	Lingfield	House	C20	11 June 1958	TQ3890943719; 51°10′33″N 0°00′51″W	1029911	Pollard Cottage & Pollard House More images
St Peter's Cross and Village Cage	Lingfield	Cross and cage	1773	11 June 1958	TQ3859243570; 51°10′28″N 0°01′08″W	1205403	St Peter's Cross and Village Cage More images
Outwood Post Mill	Outwood	Mill	1665	11 June 1958	TQ3277045551; 51°11′38″N 0°06′05″W	1029961	Outwood Post Mill More images
Barrow Green Court	Oxted	House	Early 17th century	11 June 1958	TQ3800753046; 51°15′36″N 0°01′25″W	1189488	Barrow Green Court More images
Church of St Mary the Virgin	Oxted	Church	12th century	11 June 1958	TQ3904552984; 51°15′33″N 0°00′31″W	1189608	Church of St Mary the Virgin More images
Church of St Peter	Tandridge	Church	12th century	11 June 1958	TQ3746151163; 51°14′35″N 0°01′55″W	1189811	Church of St Peter More images

== Waverley ==
Name	Location	Type	Completed	Date designated	Grid ref. Geo-coordinates	Entry number	Image
Church of St Nicholas	Alfold	Church	c. 1100	9 March 1960	TQ0372033973; 51°05′45″N 0°31′13″W	1352752	Church of St Nicholas More images
Orchards	Bramley	House	1899	9 March 1960	SU9925843282; 51°10′49″N 0°34′53″W	1378318	Orchards More images
Munstead Wood	Busbridge	Jettied House	1897	9 March 1960	SU9821142703; 51°10′31″N 0°35′47″W	1261159	Munstead Wood More images
Church of St Mary	Chiddingfold	Church	17th century	9 March 1960	SU9600035394; 51°06′35″N 0°37′48″W	1378327	Church of St Mary More images
Church of St Mary and All Saints	Dunsfold	Church	c1270–1290	9 March 1960	SU9983036345; 51°07′04″N 0°34′30″W	1044388	Church of St Mary and All Saints More images
Elstead Bridge	Elstead	Bridge	13th century	9 March 1960	SU9054143804; 51°11′11″N 0°42′21″W	1044453	Elstead Bridge More images
Church of St Peter and St Paul	Ewhurst	Church	12th century	9 March 1960	TQ0913640472; 51°09′11″N 0°26′27″W	1190455	Church of St Peter and St Paul More images
Church of St Andrew	Farnham	Church	12th century	29 December 1972	SU8386446680; 51°12′48″N 0°48′03″W	1044627	Church of St Andrew More images
Farnham Castle (comprising castle buildings to the south only)	Farnham	Castle	12th century	26 April 1950	SU8374447271; 51°13′07″N 0°48′08″W	1044677	Farnham Castle (comprising castle buildings to the south only) More images
Outer curtain wall and gatehouse at Farnham Castle	Farnham	Gatehouse	Late 12th century to early 13th century	26 April 1950	SU8366447340; 51°13′09″N 0°48′12″W	1242110	Outer curtain wall and gatehouse at Farnham Castle More images
The Grange	Farnham	House	c.1710	26 April 1950	SU8359447391; 51°13′11″N 0°48′16″W	1044678	The Grange More images
Willmer House	Farnham	House	1718	26 April 1950	SU8359746681; 51°12′48″N 0°48′16″W	1258470	Willmer House More images
Church of St Peter and St Paul	Godalming	Church	11th century	18 December 1947	SU9681444000; 51°11′13″N 0°36′58″W	1044546	Church of St Peter and St Paul More images
The Almshouses	Wyatt's Close, Godalming	Alms Houses	1622	18 December 1947	SU9818444808; 51°11′39″N 0°35′47″W	1293743	The Almshouses More images
Tigbourne Court	Wormley & Hambledon	House	1899-1901	9 March 1960	SU9567537910; 51°07′57″N 0°38′02″W	1240229	Tigbourne Court More images
Granary at Home Farm	Peper Harow Park, Peper Harow	Granary	17th century	9 March 1960	SU9345944178; 51°11′21″N 0°39′51″W	1294589	Granary at Home Farm More images
Peper Harow House	Peper Harow Park, Peper Harow	Country House	1765-8	9 March 1960	SU9356743929; 51°11′13″N 0°39′45″W	1044443	Peper Harow House More images
Church of St Michael and All Angels	Thursley	Church	Mid-11th century	9 March 1960	SU9010139378; 51°08′48″N 0°42′48″W	1260876	Church of St Michael and All Angels More images
Bridge over the River Wey to the north-east side of the green	Tilford	Bridge	13th century	9 March 1960	SU8738643449; 51°11′01″N 0°45′04″W	1189159	Bridge over the River Wey to the north-east side of the green More images
Bridge over the River Wey to the north-west corner of the green	Tilford	Bridge	13th century	9 March 1960	SU8717443524; 51°11′04″N 0°45′15″W	1044414	Bridge over the River Wey to the north-west corner of the green More images
Church of All Saints	Witley	Church	11th century	9 March 1960	SU9466739698; 51°08′55″N 0°38′53″W	1260732	Church of All Saints More images
Great Tangley Manor	Wonersh	Hall House	15th century	9 March 1960	TQ0196046574; 51°12′33″N 0°32′30″W	1241457	Great Tangley Manor More images

== Woking ==
Name	Location	Type	Completed	Date designated	Grid ref. Geo-coordinates	Entry number	Image
Church of St Mary the Virgin	Byfleet	Church	13th century	22 July 1953	TQ0628860407; 51°19′58″N 0°28′33″W	1378241	Church of St Mary the Virgin More images
Church of St Nicholas	Pyrford	Church	12th century	22 July 1953	TQ0398758231; 51°18′49″N 0°30′34″W	1044721	Church of St Nicholas More images
Church of St Peter	Old Woking	Church	1776	22 July 1953	TQ0208456845; 51°18′06″N 0°32′13″W	1044724	Church of St Peter More images
Sutton Place including the service court yard	Woking	House	17th century	22 July 1953	TQ0119553518; 51°16′19″N 0°33′03″W	1236810	Sutton Place including the service court yard More images
Shah Jahan Mosque	Woking	Mosque	1889	6 January 1984	TQ0151459180; 51°19′22″N 0°32′40″W	1264438	Shah Jahan Mosque More images

== See also ==
- Grade II* listed buildings in Surrey
