= Samuel Manship =

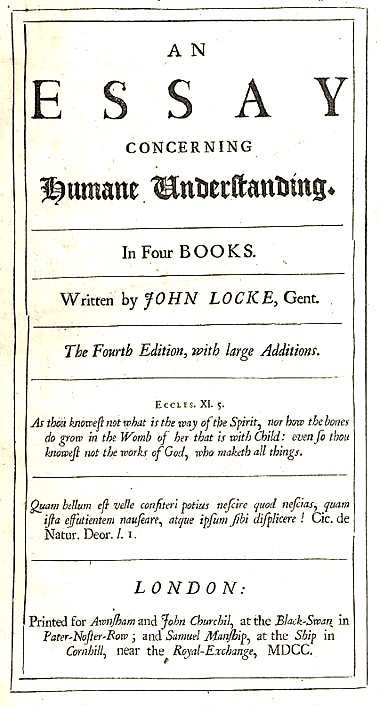
- Born: about 1665
- Died: January 1720
- Occupations: Stationer, bookseller, publisher
- Known for: Publication of philosophy and theology

Samuel Manship was an English stationer and bookseller in the City of London who acted as publisher for several noted writers and became a landowner in Surrey.

== Life ==
Born about 1665, he was the second son of the Reverend John Manship (1612–1689) from Locking, Somerset and his wife Barbara. His father had been rector of the Anglican church of St Nicolas, Guildford but in 1662 was ejected and instead became a physician and Presbyterian preacher in Guildford. His elder brother John Manship (1659–1705) became an Oxford don and physician.

Samuel went into business in the City of London, being admitted a Citizen and Member of the Stationers Company. From premises in Cornhill, first at the sign of The Black Bull and later at The Ship, he sold books and stationery. His shop also served as a distribution point for many art sale catalogues

His main fame is as a publisher who acted for a large number of contemporary writers, both English and French, on a variety of subjects, particularly philosophy and theology. Among his authors were :
Antoine Arnauld
Mary Astell
William Beveridge
Antoinette Bourignon de la Porte
François de Chavigny de la Bretonnière
Edmund Chishull
Henry Dodwell
Sir George Etherege
Sir Roger L'Estrange
John Locke
Nicolas Malebranche
Luke Milbourne
Pierre Nicole
John Norris
Christopher Packe
John Pennyman, the husband of Mary Pennyman
John Rawlet
John Scott
Susanna Wesley and
William Winstanley.

In 1709 he acquired the manor and mansion of Field Place at Compton outside Guildford(the house sold for 6 million pounds in 2006). As an elector in the Cornhill Ward, local activists of the Whig party wanted his vote and in a meeting on 16 December 1714 resolved to approach him through the Lord Chancellor, William Cowper, 1st Earl Cowper. He was buried on 24 January 1720 in the new vault of the church of St Michael, Cornhill and his will was proved on 1 February 1720

== Family ==
On 16 July 1692 he married Anne Lane and they had seven children. His eldest son John Manship (1695–1749), who went into business as a cloth merchant, in 1723 married Elizabeth Garbrand (1706–1788), a descendant of the bookseller Gerbrand Harkes, and inherited the estate at Compton on the death of his mother in 1734. The eldest surviving daughter Elizabeth Manship (1701–1733) married Richard Dowdeswell (1692–1730), a cousin of the landowner and politician William Dowdeswell.
