= Ann Mudd =

- Born: 1612/13
- Died: after 1693

Ann Mudd (1612/13 – after 1693) was an English follower of John Pennyman who broke away from the Quakers.

== Life ==
She was born in 1612 or 1613 and she came to notice after she married Thomas Mudd from Rickmansworth. They had been Quakers but in 1672 Isaac Penington wrote to them about their criticism and failure to attend meetings. A 1673 publication titled Tyranny and Hypocrisy describes how Ann Mudd was manhandled by a Quaker at a meeting despite her being an "ancient gentlewoman". She had caused offence merely by trying to speak. Ann wrote A cry, a cry: a sensible cry for many months together hath been in my heart for the Quakers return out of that Egyptian darkness which was published in 1678. Her writing criticised the Quaker's management and their motives and noted of their poor treatment of John Pennyman. John and Mary Pennyman were close friends and correspondents.

Mudd's other life is unknown but a letter dated 1693 which she sent from Wilscomb noted that she was 80 and that she did not expect to live much more.
