= St Nicolas Church, Guildford =

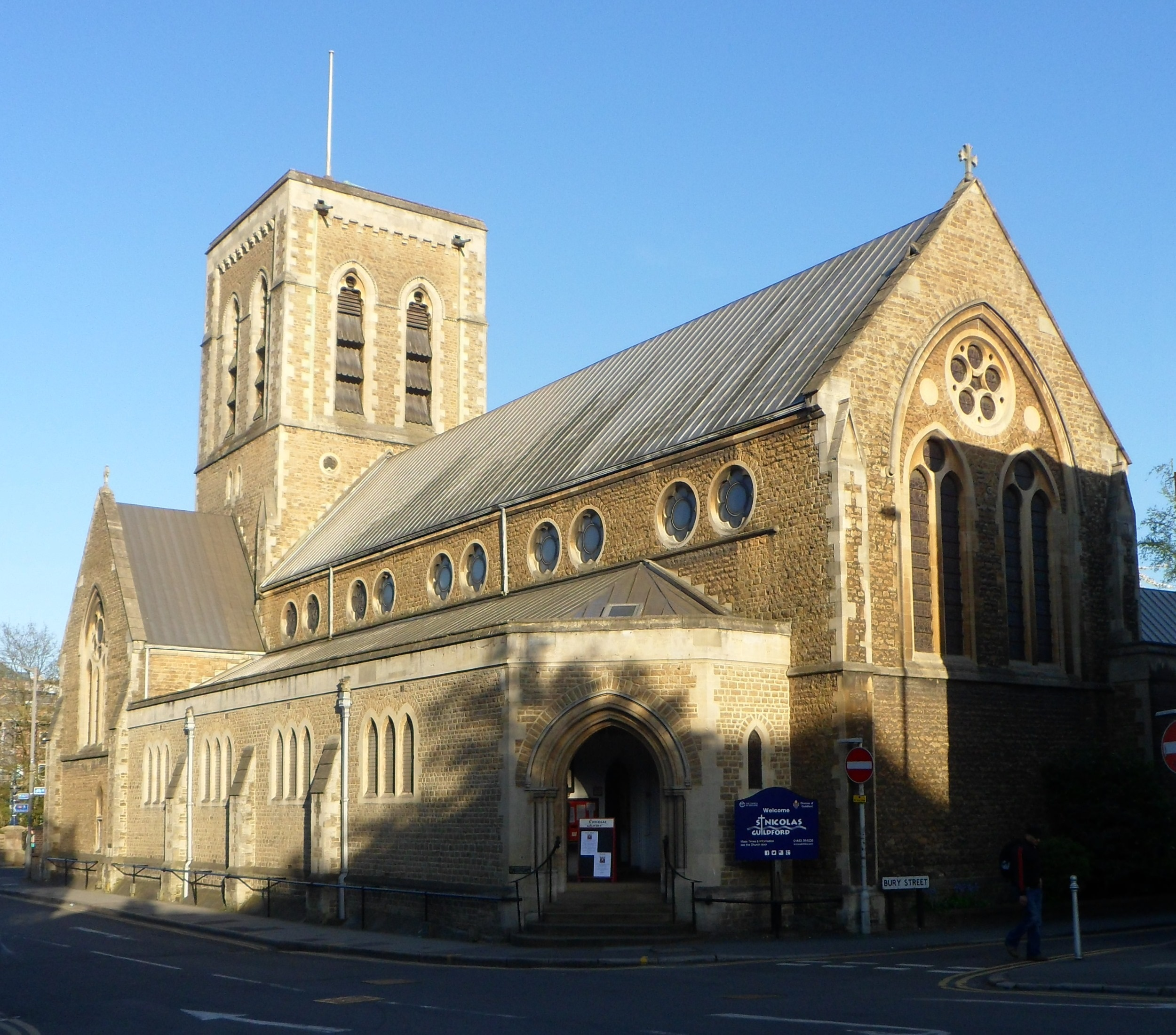
- St Nicolas Church, Guildford
- 51°14′05″N 0°34′39″W
- Location: Bury Street, Guildford, Surrey
- Country: England
- Denomination: Church of England
- Churchmanship: High Church

History
- Status: Parish church
- Dedication: Saint Nicolas
- Consecrated: April 1876

Architecture
- Functional status: Active
- Architect(s): Samuel Sanders Teulon, Ewan Christian
- Style: Victorian Gothic

Administration
- Province: Canterbury
- Diocese: Guildford
- Archdeaconry: Surrey
- Deanery: Guildford
- Parish: St Nicolas

Clergy
- Rector: Revd. Neil Roberts

St Nicolas' is an Anglican parish church in Guildford, England. It is a Grade II* listed building.

== Location and parish ==
=== Location ===
St Nicolas’ church (spelt ‘Nicholas’ until the early 20th century) is on the left bank of the River Wey, at the bottom of Guildford High Street, which extends across the river via the now pedestrianised Town Bridge. The present church, consecrated in 1876, is the third church on the site. It is one of the three ancient parish churches of the town. The other two have combined in their ministry, Holy Trinity and St Mary's, on the east side of the river, which had the majority of the townsfolk until the 20th century when the town expanded westwards across the river.

=== Parish ===
The parish is one of the three ancient parishes of Guildford borough, together with Holy Trinity and St Mary's,. Those parishes lie on the east bank of the river, but the ancient borough extended across the river to include the westernmost part of the much larger St Nicolas’ parish. The ancient parish was c. 2600 acres, with the easternmost section historically incorporated into Guildford borough, but with a large rural hinterland extending west into Godalming A Hundred and including the tithings of Artington and Littleton. During the last century, the creation of the new parishes of All Saints in Onslow Village and St Francis Littleton have reduced the size of St Nicolas’ parish. The parish includes Loseley, the home of the More (later More-Molyneux) family since 1509, whose memorial chapel, dating from c. 1550, is attached to the south side of St Nicolas’ church. Also within the parish on St Catherine's Hill is the ruined Grade I listed St Catherine’s Chapel dating c. 1300, an enigmatic building with royal and pilgrimage connections.

== Literary connections ==
=== Hymn and carol writers and composers ===
John Mason Neale wrote and/or composed: Good King Wenceslas, O happy band of pilgrims: Deacon (junior clergy).

John Samuel Bewley Monsell wrote and/or composed Fight the good fight and O worship the Lord in the beauty of holiness: Rector (parish priest).

=== Secular works ===
Writer P.G. Wodehouse was baptised with the waters of the font.

Son of the rector John Manship (1612-1689) was Samuel Manship, a London publisher of theology and philosophy.

== Architecture ==
The building is of cut stone and some mortar-infused rubblestone and is listed in the middle category of statutory listing, Grade II* chiefly for its ashlar-cut, bi-colour stone tower with quoining, its internal arches, pillars and its many decorative apertures by Teulon and Ewan Christian.

The west end has a straight gable end excepting tall, shallow outside buttresses in light-stone relief. It has matching pointed arch windows consisting of tall close lancet lights and a small roundel above. A five-light trefoil window is above. The church is built from the south and west Surrey yellow ironstone-sandstone (Bargate stone) with 10 consecutive round windows, grouped in pairs, towards the simple string course eave. Above immediately is guttering of equal height before the ascent of a long hipped slate roof surmounted by a simple yellow stone cross on the west end. Its north lower, long vestry and side aisle with west-facing main door is between the height of the main building culminating in a transept matching the width of the square porch tower to which it joins and running equally to the south where it forms the vestry. A square belfry tower with flagpole surmount the chancel in lighter stone than all but the northern additions.

The north transept gable end is embellished by a large plate-tracery, three-light-plus-roundel window on a sill and under a hood moulding. The chancel itself, facing east, is apsidal (hemi-spherical as to the upper part and rounded as to the lower) with vaulting. It has a marble floor and mosaics.
