= Church of St John the Evangelist, Wotton =

Church of St John the Evangelist
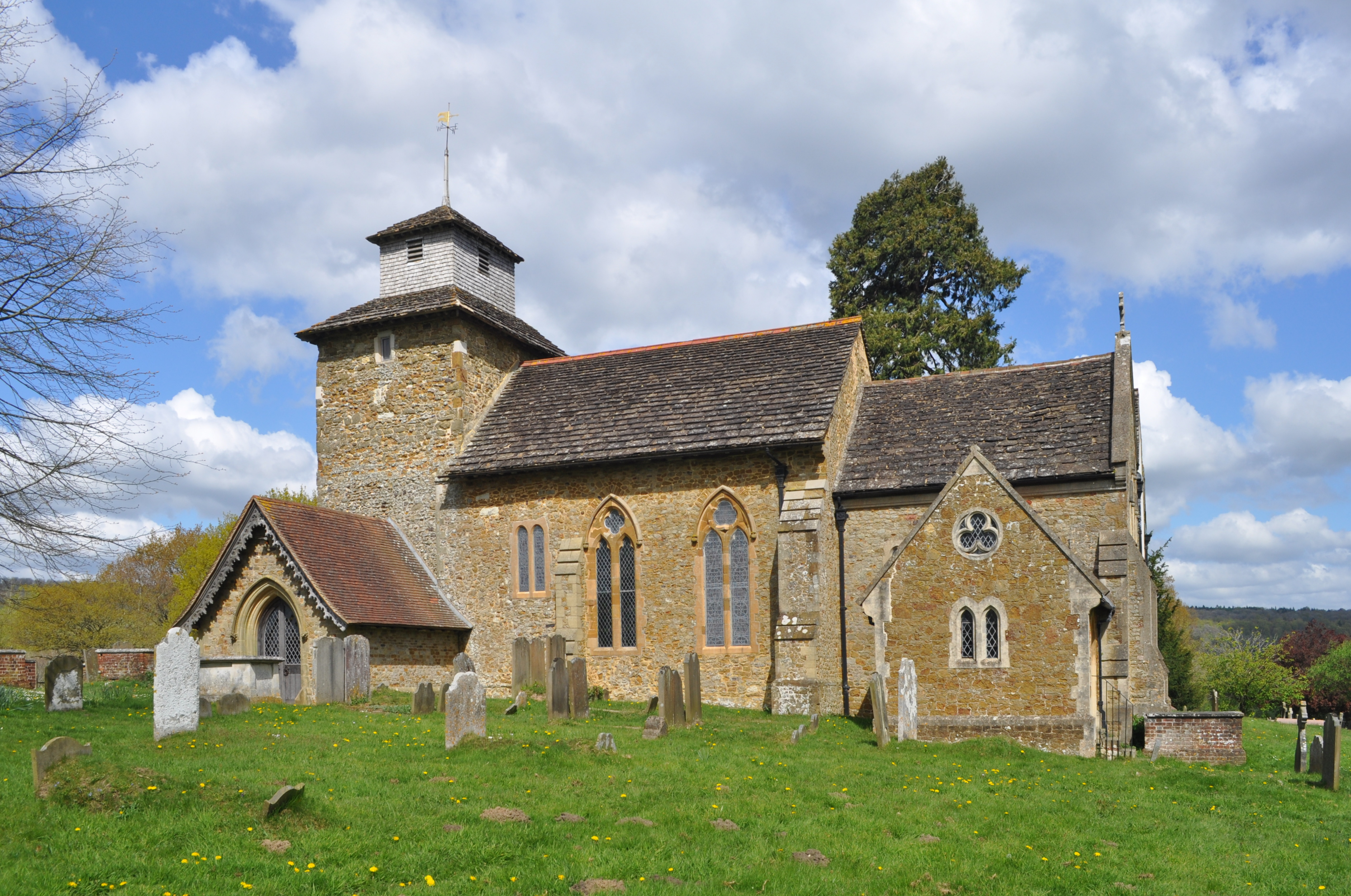
- Church of St John the Evangelist
- 51°13′11.64″N 0°23′22.29″W
- OS grid reference: TQ 12568 47977
- Location: Wotton, Surrey
- Country: England
- Denomination: Church of England
- Website: www.wottonchurch.org

Architecture
- Heritage designation: Grade I
- Designated: 11 November 1966

Administration
- Diocese: Diocese of Guildford

The Church of St John the Evangelist is an Anglican church in the village of Wotton, in Surrey, England. It is in the benefice of Abinger and Coldharbour and Wotton and Holmbury St Mary, and is in the Diocese of Guildford. The earliest parts of the building date from the mid-11th century, and it contains in the north chapel monuments to John Evelyn and other members of the Evelyn family. It is a Grade I listed building.

== Description ==
The church is built of Bargate stone rubble, with dressings of Bargate stone and firestone. The 19th-century additions are dressed with sandstone and Bath stone. The main roofs are of Horsham stone slates, and there are plain tiles over the porch and vestry. There are timber shingles over the bellcote.

A blocked arch in the west wall of the tower suggests that there was an adjoining building, of which nothing remains above ground, perhaps a porticus like those found in this position in Anglo-Saxon churches. Excavation in 1975 revealed foundations of a building.

The tower, and the unusually tall nave walls, date from the mid-11th century. The tall horseshoe-shaped tower arch, of similar form to the blocked western arch, was also part of the early church. The short north aisle, north chapel and chancel date from the 13th century. The inner south doorway dates from the 13th century; its archway is made of alternating green firestone and clunch, and the inner order has a series of minutely carved heads representing Pope, King, Priest Nobleman, Queen and Pilgrim. Dating from the 19th century are the large south porch, which replaced an older structure of similar size, the vestry south of the chancel, and the high chancel arch. North of the north chapel is a brick-built mortuary chapel, dating from the late 17th century, later converted into a parish room.

The screen between the north aisle and north chapel is of oak and has iron spikes at the top to support candles; it bears the date 1632. The font is 19th-century, in the style of the 13th century. The earlier font, now in the north chapel, is of white marble and dates from the 17th century; it is perhaps the font at which John Evelyn was baptised in 1620.

=== Monuments ===
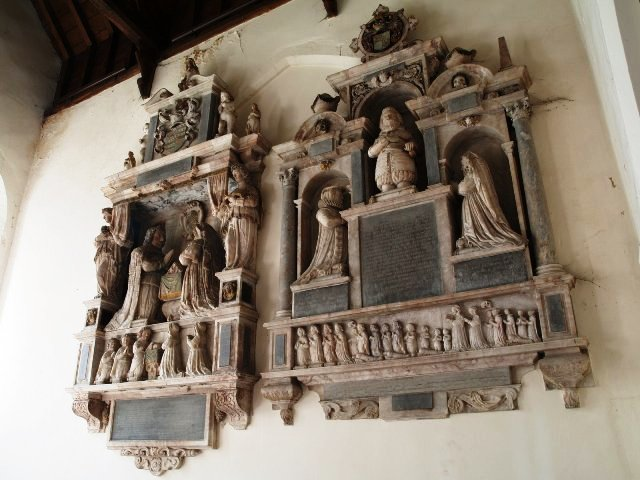
Monument to Richard Evelyn (left) and George Evelyn, in the Evelyn Chapel

The north chapel, or Evelyn chapel, contains the coffin-shaped tombs of John Evelyn (died 1706) in the eastern part, and his wife (died 1709), in the west part close to the south wall.

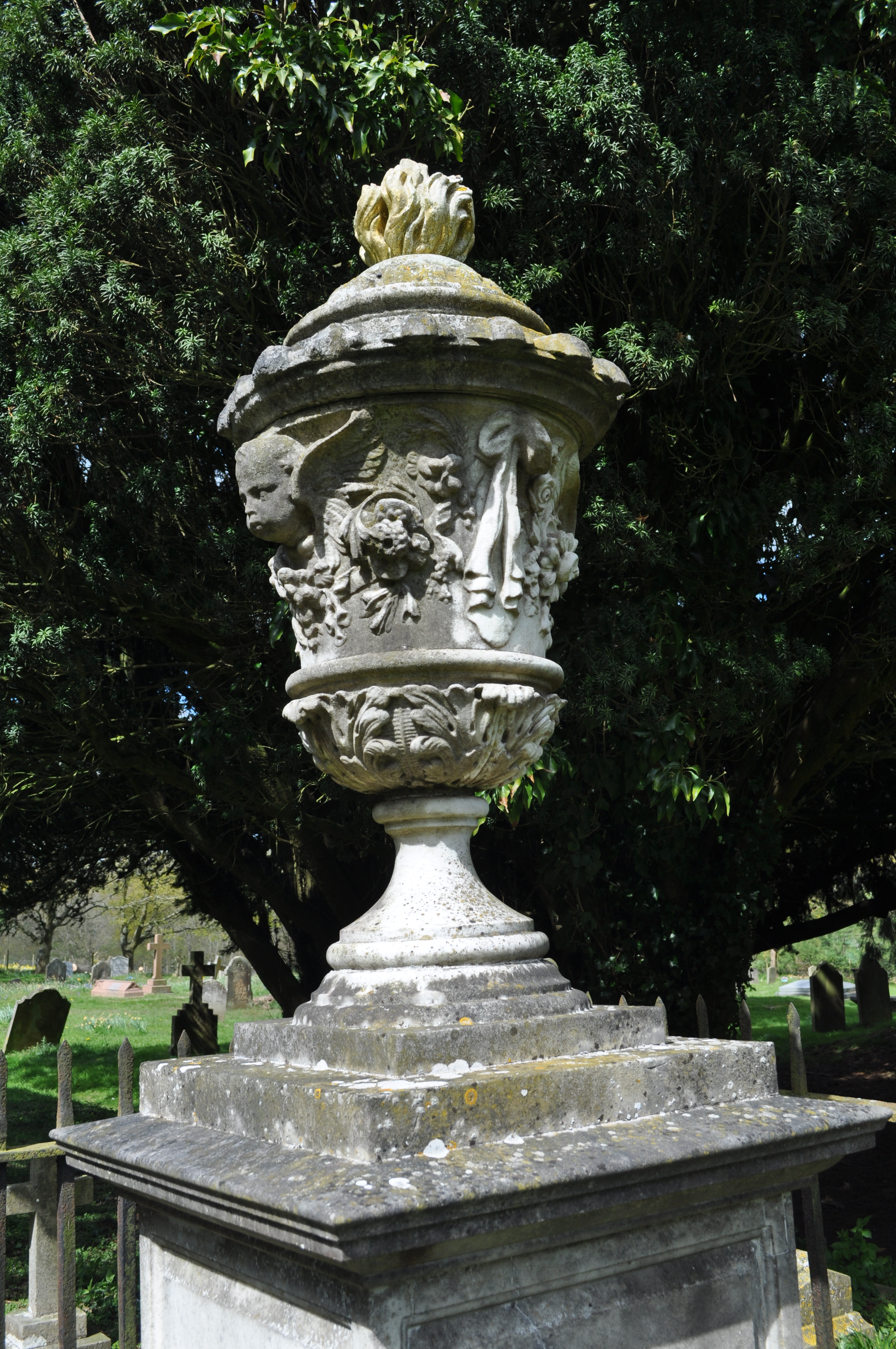
Monument to William Glanville in the churchyard

The monument to George Evelyn, who purchased Wotton, is near the west end of the south wall in the Evelyn Chapel. He died in 1603, aged 77. It is of alabaster with panels of black slate bearing inscriptions. Below his coat of arms, it shows in the centre George Evelyn in armour and kneeling; on each side are the kneeling figures of his wives Rose and Joan. Below is a long panel showing the ten sons and six daughters of Rose, and the six sons and two daughters of Joan.

To the left is the monument to George's fourth son Richard Evelyn, who died in 1640. He was the father of John Evelyn, and in 1634 was High Sheriff of Surrey and Sussex. His coat of arms is at the top; below, on each side, draped angels draw back curtains to show Richard and his wife, both kneeling and facing each other. Below are their three sons and two daughters.

Opposite to these is the monument to Elizabeth Darcy (died 1634), daughter of Richard Evelyn. She is shown weeping, and her dead baby in a cot is below.

In the south wall of the chancel is a tablet to Dr Bohun (died 1716); John Evelyn gave him the living of Wotton in 1701, and described him as "a learned person, and excellent preacher".

=== Churchyard ===
The church stands on the summit of a steep ridge, with views over a valley and the hillside opposite. There are clumps of tall trees in the churchyard, some of which are thought to have been planted by John Evelyn.

There are low openings in the churchyard walls, probably to allow sheep from surrounding fields to graze in the churchyard. On the north side of the churchyard is the monument, listed Grade II, marking the grave of William Glanville, nephew of John Evelyn. It has a carved urn, bearing cherubs' heads, on a pedestal.

== See also ==
- Grade I listed buildings in Surrey
- List of places of worship in Mole Valley
