= Guildford House =

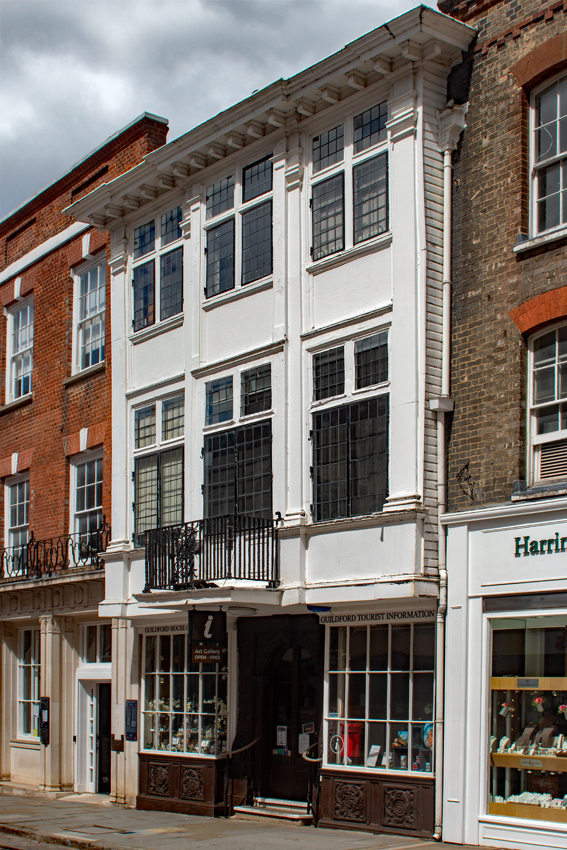
- Guildford House museum and art gallery

- Location within Surrey
- 51°14′10″N 0°34′17″W
- Type: Town house
- Location: 155 High Street, Guildford, Surrey
- OS grid reference: SU 99825 49515

History
- Built: 1660

Site notes
- Owner: Guildford Borough Council

Listed Building – Grade I
- Official name: Guildford House
- Designated: 1 May 1953
- Reference no.: 1180153

Guildford House is a historic house at 155 High Street, Guildford, Surrey, England. Built in 1660, it is currently a municipal museum and art gallery.

== History ==
Originally built for John Childs, a lawyer and, later, Mayor of Guildford on three occasions. In 1726, it was bought by John Martyr, also a lawyer, and remained in the family until 1850, when it was bought by Frank Apted as a shop for his brush and carpentry business. From 1914 to 1928, it was a stationers and booksellers. After a year as the carpet department of the adjoining drapers store, in 1929, it was converted into a restaurant which operated until 1956.

The house is a Grade I listed building in part for having many original features including a carved staircase, panelled rooms, original decorative plaster ceilings and wrought iron window fittings. Also for its timber-framed basic structure, which is clad to the front in painted wood and to the rear in mathematical tiles and tile-hanging.

== Today ==
The house contains some of Guildford borough's art collection including the world's largest public collection of pastel portraits by Guildford-born artist, John Russell, RA (1745–1806). Guildford House hosts changing exhibitions throughout the year. In June 2009, the administration of Guildford House, with Guildford Museum, Guildford Guildhall and Guildford Castle were brought together and run collectively as 'Guildford Heritage'.

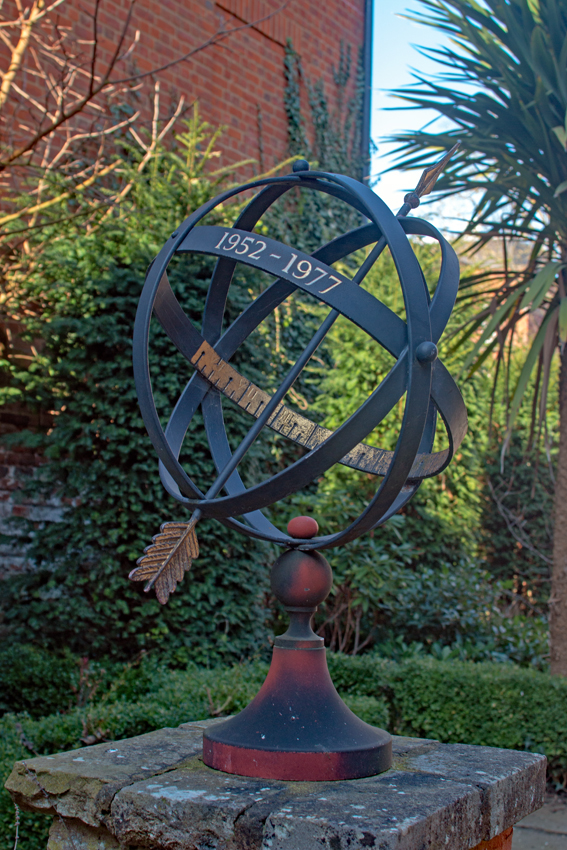
Astrolabe by Richard Quinnel in the courtyard
