= Reigate Priory =

Grade I-listed building in Reigate, Surrey

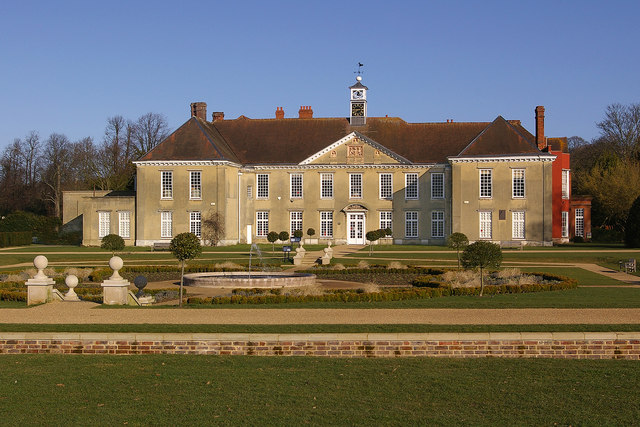
- Reigate Priory south elevation

- Location within Surrey
- 51°14′08″N 0°12′23″W

Site notes
- Owner: Reigate and Banstead Borough Council

Listed Building – Grade I
- Official name: Reigate Priory
- Designated: 19 October 1951
- Reference no.: 1188089

Listed Building – Grade II
- Official name: Reigate Priory (park and garden)
- Designated: 1 June 1984
- Reference no.: 1001175

Listed Building – Grade II
- Official name: Garden wall of Reigate Priory
- Designated: 31 March 1977
- Reference no.: 1029138

Listed Building – Grade II
- Official name: Gatepiers at entrance to Reigate Priory
- Designated: 28 March 1988
- Reference no.: 1241295

Reigate Priory is a Grade I listed building in Reigate, Surrey, England. It was founded in the first half of the 13th century as an Augustinian priory. Following its dissolution in 1536, the buildings were converted to a private residence for William Howard, 1st Baron Howard of Effingham. Later owners included Charles Howard, 1st Earl of Nottingham, who led the English fleet against the Spanish Armada, and John Parsons, one of the MPs for Reigate and the former Lord Mayor of London.

The southern part of the priory grounds were bought by Randall Vogan in 1920, who donated them to Reigate and Banstead Borough Council. The council purchased the remainder of the grounds in 1948. Since 1948, the building has been in use as a school.

== History ==
William de Warenne, the fifth Earl of Surrey, is thought to have founded the Augustinian priory at Reigate before 1240. The fifth Earl's parents, Hamelin and Isabel de Warenne had previously presented Reigate Church to the Augustinian Priory of St Mary Overie in Southwark. Early documents refer to the priory as a hospital, but in 1334 it is described as a convent and thereafter as a purely religious institution. It was dedicated by the founder to the Virgin Mary and the Holy Cross.

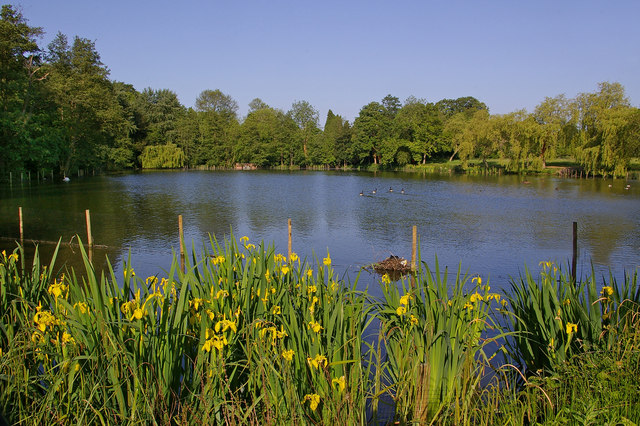
Former fish pond in Priory Park, restored in 2007

The priory was built to the south of the modern town centre, close to the Wray stream, a tributary of the Wallace Brook, and a series of fish ponds was constructed in the grounds. Although the exact layout is uncertain, the buildings are thought to have been arranged around a central square cloister, with the church on the north side and the refectory on the south. It is thought that the priory was constructed of the local Reigate Stone and part of the walls of the church are incorporated into those of the present school hall. There was a gatehouse to the west and excavations in 1993, suggest that there was a guesthouse or infirmary to the north.

The priory was created as a sub-manor of Reigate and was granted several local farms including one in each of Salfords and Horley. It also received the manor of Southwick in West Sussex, which it gave to the Bishop of Winchester in 1335 and to compensate for the loss of income, it was awarded the annual pension from St Martin's Church in Dorking. From the 1190s until at least 1291, St Martin's Church had paid an annual pension of £6 to Lewes Priory in East Sussex. Later grants to Reigate Priory include land in Burstow and Westhumble, as well as the advowson of St Michael's Church, Mickleham. At the time of its dissolution in 1536, Reigate Priory was the least wealthy of all the Surrey religious houses.

In 1541, Henry VIII granted the former priory to William Howard, 1st Baron Howard of Effingham, the uncle of Catherine Howard. The old church was converted to a private residence and the majority of the rest of the buildings were demolished. The chancel at the east end of the priory church became the Howards' private chapel. A dendrochronology study carried out in 2003 showed that several of the timbers in the roof of the present building were from trees felled between 1553 and 1564.

In 1615, the estate was inherited by Charles Howard, 1st Earl of Nottingham, who had led the English fleet against the Spanish Armada. On his death in 1624, it became the residence of his widow, Anne St John, and then passed in 1639 to his daughter, Elizabeth, who had married John Mordaunt, 1st Earl of Peterborough. In 1681, her grandson, Charles Mordaunt, 3rd Earl of Peterborough, sold the priory to John Parsons, one of the MPs for Reigate and the former Lord Mayor of London. John Parsons was typical of several London businessmen who had experienced the Great Plague of 1665–66 and who chose to move their residences out of the city.

Richard Ireland, who purchased the priory in 1766 following the death of Humphrey Parsons, is primarily responsible for the appearance of the buildings today. A fire destroyed much of the west wing and Ireland commissioned its rebuilding. He also shortened the length of the east wing from 75 to 25 ft (22.9 to 7.6 m), so that the house was symmetrical. The walls of the two wings were raised to match the main north range and the Tudor features including the windows were replaced with Georgian fixtures. Finally the south-facing walls were refaced with a cement stucco. Following Ireland's death in 1780, the priory passed through a succession of owners, including Lady Henry Somerset, who remodelled the grounds between 1883 and 1895, creating a sunken garden. She commissioned the rebuilding of the eastern side of the house, to provide new kitchens, a dining room, improved servants' quarters and guest bedrooms. After Somerset's death in 1921, the estate was divided for sale and much of the land was purchased for housebuilding.

The final private owner of the house was the racehorse trainer, Peter Beatty, who sold it to the Mutual Property Life and General Insurance Company, which relocated from London for the second half of the Second World War. In 1948, the borough council bought the grounds, having secured them as Public Open Space three years earlier. Also in 1948, the Reigate Priory County Secondary School opened in the main priory building, with 140 children aged 13 and 14. In 1963 the boys moved to Woodhatch School and the Priory School continued as an all-girls secondary school. In 1971, the secondary school closed and Holmesdale Middle School, which had been founded in 1852, moved to the priory.

The southern part of Priory Park was purchased by Randal Vogan in 1920, who donated the land to Reigate and Banstead Borough Council "to be preserved in its natural beauty for the use and quiet enjoyment of the public". The remainder of the 58 ha (140-acre) priory grounds were acquired by the borough council in 1948. In 2007, the borough council began a restoration project, partly funded by a £4.2M lottery grant. The pavilion, which houses a café, was designed by the architect, Dominique Perrault, and was constructed as part of the project. The park offers a children's play area, tennis courts and a skate park, as well as walking trails, formal gardens and a lake.

== Bibliography ==
- Black, Ros (2010). A talent for humanity : The life and work of Lady Henry Somerset. Chippenham: Antony Rowe Publishing. ISBN 978-1-90-520093-1.
- Hooper, Wilfrid (1979) [1945]. Reigate: Its story through the ages. Guildford: Surrey Archaeological Society. ISBN 978-0-90-396712-9.
- Scears, Ernest (1950). A history of Reigate Priory. Dorking: Chevertons.
- Ward, Audrey (1998). Discovering Reigate Priory. Bluestream. ISBN 978-1-90-186002-3.
