= Outwood Windmill =

Post mill in Outwood, Surrey, UK

Outwood post mill
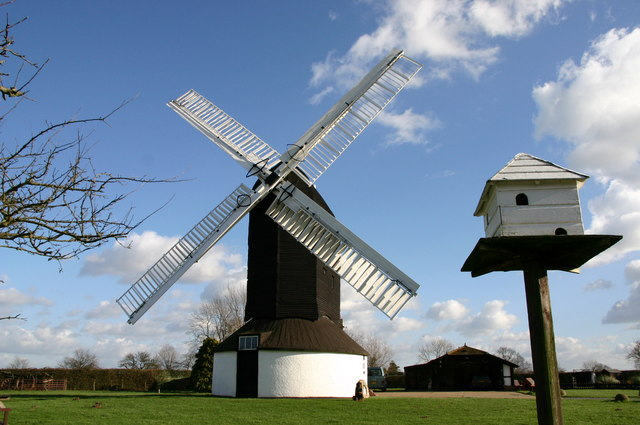
- Outwood post mill

Origin
- Mill name: Outwod post mill
- Mill location: Outwood, Surrey
- Grid reference: TQ 3277 4555
- Coordinates: 51°11′38″N 0°06′04″W
- Operator(s): Private
- Year built: 1665

Information
- Purpose: Corn mill
- Type: Post mill
- Roundhouse storeys: Single storey roundhouse
- No. of sails: Four sails
- Type of sails: Spring sails
- Windshaft: Wood, with cast iron poll end
- Winding: Tailpole
- No. of pairs of millstones: Two pairs, Head and Tail
- Size of millstones: 4 feet (1.22 m) diameter

Outwood Windmill is a Grade I listed post mill in Outwood, Surrey. Built in 1665 by Thomas Budgen, a miller from Nutfield in Surrey, it is Britain's oldest working windmill. It was one of a pair after 1797, alongside a smock mill that had the tallest smock tower in the United Kingdom until its collapse in 1960.

== History ==
=== Post mill ===
Outwood Windmill was built for Thomas Budgen (1640–1716) in 1665. The original deed for its erection is still in existence. Thomas Budgen borrowed the money to finance the building of the windmill from two of his brothers-in-law. He was able to repay them within two years. The builders of the mill are traditionally said to have watched the Great Fire of London glowing in the distance, some 25 miles (40 km) away. In 1678, Thomas Budgen was convicted under the Conventicle Act as a seditious preacher, and fined £20.

John Budgen took the mill on his father's death, and in 1715 was paying Quit Rent on the mill, a malthouse and a brick kiln. John Budgen died in 1765 and the rent was paid by his widow until she died in 1768, when Ezekiel Budgen took the mill. Ezekiel Budgen was involved in a quarrel with his brother Isaac, which led to William Budgen (Ezekiel's nephew) being granted a piece of land near the mill in 1796 with liberty to erect a windmill upon it. By 1806, the mill was in the possession of John Jupp. William Jupp took the mill sometime before 1880 and ran it until he died in 1934. In 1929, the Windmill Section of the Society for the Protection of Ancient Buildings recognised the mill as "of paramount importance". A new pair of Spring sails were needed in 1931. The Society paid for Thomas Hunt, the Soham millwright, to make and fit these at a cost of £80. William Jupp agreed not to sell the mill for demolition as a condition of the work being done. Publicity generated at the time led to an increase in orders at the mill. On 30 October 1931, a meeting was held to appeal for funds to replace the older pair of sails. Hilaire Belloc, who at the time owned Shipley windmill in Sussex, was the main speaker. Sir Joseph Rank was one of the subscribers. In 1933, a pair of sails was purchased secondhand. These had previously been on the Black Mill, Forncett End, Norfolk, which had been demolished in September 1932. These replaced a pair of sails that had been on the mill for in excess of sixty years. William Jupp died in 1934.

Stanley Jupp then took the mill. In the 1930s the mill was little used and started to deteriorate. Plans were drawn up for further restoration, but were postponed due to World War II. Milling ceased in 1949 when the breast beam cracked and the windshaft dropped causing the sails to touch the roundhouse roof. Temporary repairs were made by millwrights E Hole & Son of Burgess Hill, followed by extensive repairs, including a new breast beam and prick post, in 1952. One of the sail stocks was found to be defective in 1955 and a new pair of spring sails was fitted. A grant of £750 from the Ministry of Works was given to enable the work to be carried out, on condition that public access would be given by appointment. The older of the two stocks broke in January 1956. E Hole & Son fitted a new stock and sail on 25 October 1958. William Jupp ran the mill until 1962. In the autumn of 1962, the mill was bought by the Thomas brothers.

On 12 June 1964, the mill was caught in a severe thunderstorm. The mill was tailwinded,^{[Note 1]} and only saved when the new owners turned the mill so that the wind was side on to the mill. On 5 January 2012, a sail was damaged in a gale. In 2018, the mill was offered for sale, with a price tag of £800,000.

=== Smock mill ===
Outwood smock mill
- The smock mill, c.1903. Note the missing fantail has been drawn in

Origin
- Mill name: High Mill
- Year built: 1796

Information
- Purpose: Corn mill
- Type: Smock mill
- Storeys: Five-storey smock
- Base storeys: Low brick base of a few courses
- Smock sides: Eight sides
- No. of sails: Four sails
- Type of sails: Spring Patent sails
- Windshaft: Cast iron
- Winding: Fantail
- No. of pairs of millstones: Four pairs
- Year lost: 1960
- Other information: Tallest smock tower of any windmill in the United Kingdom

On 24 November 1796, William Budgen was granted leave to erect a windmill on a plot of land near the post mill. (In the ' Sights and Sounds of Britain ' Lyntone ' Flexidisc, from 1972, " Presented by " Johnny Morris, but with words unattributed to him, this second mill's building date was given as 1870 ) .

The smock mill was run by the Budgen family until 1885 when Edward Scott, of Woolpits Mill, Nutfield bought the lease of the mill for £1,225. The mill was later worked be Edward's son, and in 1903 one of the sails broke whilst the mill was at work. It was worked with only two sails until 1914, assisted by a portable steam engine as necessary. In 1950, the preservation of the mill was proposed. A survey undertaken in 1953 showed the mill had rotten cant posts and sills at the southwest side (facing the prevailing weather), with prohibitively high repair costs. It collapsed on the morning of 25 November 1960.

== Description ==
=== Post mill ===
Outwood Mill is a post mill on a single-storey roundhouse. It has four Spring sails controlled by elliptical springs, carried on a wooden Windshaft with a cast iron poll end. The mill drives two pairs of millstones, arranged Head and Tail and is winded by tailpole.

Substructure

The oak trestle is composed of two crosstrees, four quarterbars and the main post. The crosstrees are 22 feet (6.71 m) long and 12 inches (300 mm) square in section, as are the quarterbars. The main post is 16-foot-3-inch (4.95 m) high, and tapers from 29 inches (740 mm) square at the base to 16 inches (410 mm) diameter at the Samson Head. The whole is housed in a roundhouse of 22 feet (6.71 m) diameter with 9 feet (2.74 m) high walls.

Body

The body of the mill measures 18 feet (5.49 m) by 11 feet (3.35 m) in plan, and the mill is 39 feet (11.89 m) tall to the roof. All the milling machinery is housed within the body. The Crown Tree bears a date of 1880, possibly indicating its replacement in that year. The body weighs about 25 long tons (25.4 t).

Machinery

The mill has carried a number of sails over the years. In 1905, it is known to have had odd sails, one pair being double shuttered Spring sails of 25 feet (7.62 m) length, and tapering from 7-foot-6-inch (2.29 m) wide at the heel to 7-foot-1-inch (2.16 m) at the tip. The other pair were narrower, tapering from 6 feet (1.83 m) at the heel to 5-foot-6-inch (1.68 m) at the tip. These were carried by an oak windshaft with a cast-iron poll end. The sails currently on the mill span 60 feet (18.29 m). The windshaft is 16 feet (4.88 m) long, and tapers from 23 inches (0.58 m) diameter at the neck to 13 inches (0.33 m) diameter at the tail. The windshaft carries an 8-foot-3-inch (2.51 m) diameter wooden Head Wheel with 108 cogs and a composite Tail Wheel, with a cast-iron centre and wooden rim. The Tail Wheel has 84 cogs. The Head stones are 4 feet (1.22 m) diameter Peak stones, and the Tail stones are French Burr stones. Both wheels drove additional machinery in the past, the Head wheel driving an oat crusher (now no longer in place) and the Tail Wheel driving the sack hoist.

=== Smock mill ===
Outwood Smock Mill, also known as High Mill, was a tall smock mill of five storeys, with a stage at first-floor level. It was built on a low brick base less than 2 feet (610 mm) high. The cant posts were 48 feet (14.63 m) long, and the mill stood 62 feet (18.90 m) high to the top of the cap. This made it the tallest smock ever built, although not the tallest smock mill (Union Mill, Cranbrook takes that honour). Unusually, the ground floor was above ground level, at a height of about 3 feet (910 mm). The smock was 26 feet (7.92 m) across the flats at the base, and 13 feet (3.96 m) at the curb. The cap was 13 feet (3.96 m) by 11-foot-6-inch (3.51 m) in plan, and winded by a five-bladed fantail. The four sails were Spring Patents, spanning 80 feet (24.38 m), carried in a cast-iron Windshaft. The Brake Wheel was 9-foot-10-inch (3.00 m) diameter, driving a 4 feet (1.22 m) diameter cast-iron Wallower. This had replaced an earlier Wallower of 4-foot-8-inch (1.42 m) diameter which bore a date of 1864, indicating that the mill had three wallowers in a working life of 117 years. The wooden Upright shaft was sixteen-sided, 20 inches (510 mm) across the flats, with a dog clutch allowing the windmill to be disconnected when the mill was being driven by the portable engine. The wooden Great Spur Wheel was 8-foot-8-inch (2.64 m) diameter, with 120 cogs. The mill drove four pairs of overdrift millstones, one pair bearing a date of 1859.

== Millers ==
The following millers were associated with Outwood windmills.

=== Post mill ===
- Thomas Budgen 1665 – 1716
- John Budgen 1716 – 1765
- widow Budgen 1765 – 1768
- Ezekiel Budgen 1768 – ?
- John Jupp 1807 – ?
- William Jupp 1880 – 1934
- Stanley Jupp 1934 – 1962
- Gerald & Raymond Thomas 1962 – 1996

=== Smock mill ===
- William Budgen 1797 – ?
- Edward Scott 1885 – 1914

== Notes ==
1. A windmill is tailwinded when the wind blows onto the sails from the rear. The effects of this can be catastrophic; post and smock mills can be blown down. Smock and tower mills can have their cap, sails and fantails blown off.
