= Wayneflete Tower =

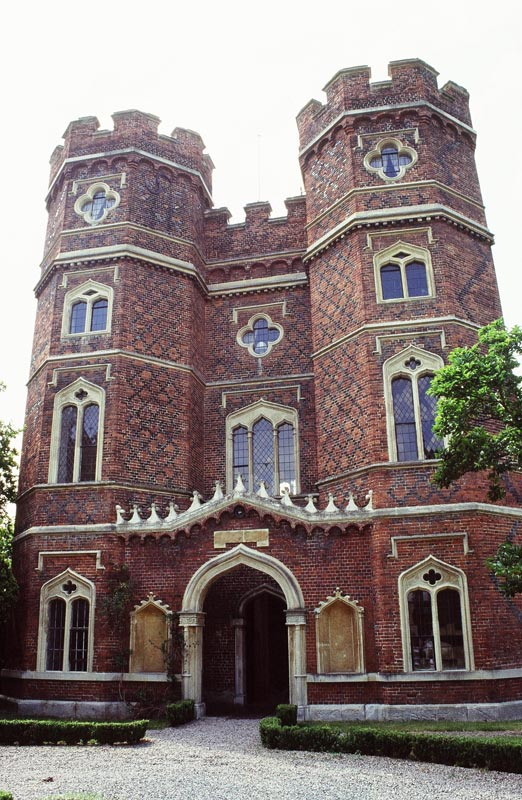
- Wayneflete Tower

- Location within Surrey
- 51°22′25″N 0°22′36″W
- Type: Gatehouse
- Location: Esher, Surrey
- OS grid reference: TQ 13079 65103

History
- Built: 1462

Listed Building – Grade I
- Official name: Wayneflete's Tower
- Designated: 14 August 1953
- Reference no.: 1286940

Wayneflete Tower, also known as Waynflete's Tower, is a historical gatehouse located in Esher, near London. it was originally part of the Palace of Esher, established in 1462 by Bishop William Waynflete of Winchester, and was connected to the keep by a curtain wall. During the 17th century, much of the palace was demolished, including its furnishings and granite blocks. In the 18th century, the tower was made part of a Gothic-style mansion house designed by William Kent for its then-owner, Henry Pelham. Today, the tower is a Grade I listed building and a residence.

== See also ==
- Esher Place

== Bibliography ==
- Nairn, Ian; Pevsner, Nicholas (2002). Cherry, Bridget (ed.). The Buildings of England: Surrey (Revised 2nd ed.). Yale University Press. ISBN 0-300-09675-5.
- "A Complete History of the Tower of Esher – A William Wayneflete Landmark by Penny Rainbow". Wayneflete Tower.
- Wessex Archaeology report on the Time Team investigation
