= St Catherine's Hill, Surrey =

Coordinates: 51.22427°N 0.57848°W

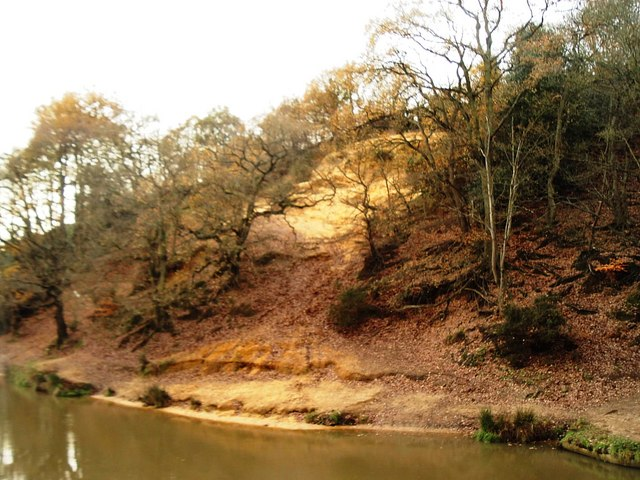
The base of St Catherine's Hill

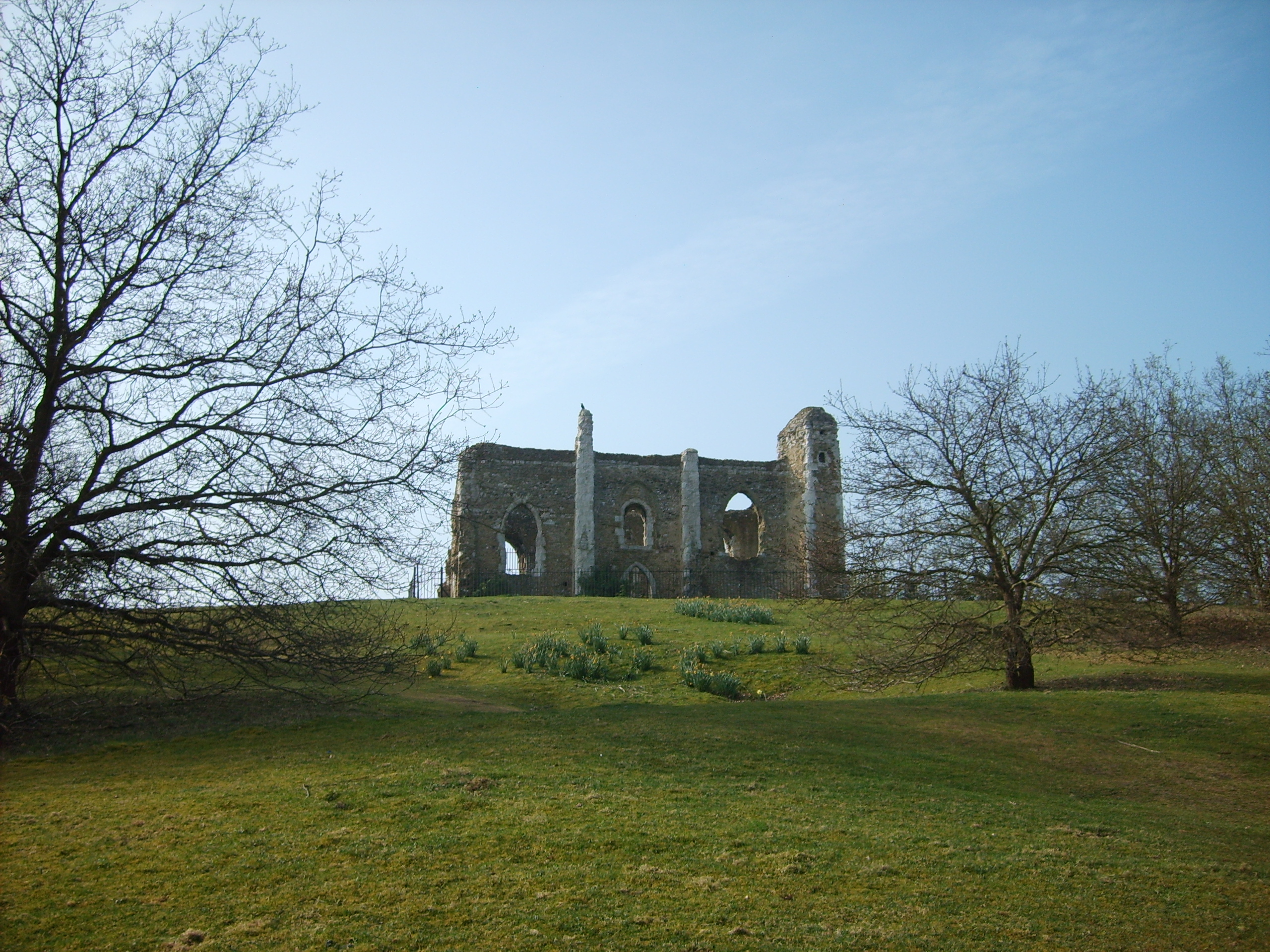
Looking up St Catherine's Hill towards the chapel.

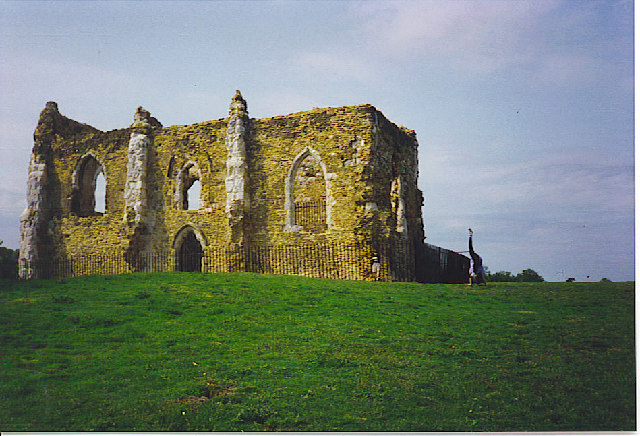
St Catherine's Chapel on top of St Catherine's Hill

St Catherine's Hill is a hill south of Guildford in Surrey, England, with a ruined chapel on its top.

The hill is about half a mile south of Guildford on the way to Godalming, near the village of Artington and the River Wey. The village is on a sandstone outcrop near the Pilgrims' Way, at the crossing on the river.

== Chapel ==
The name is derived from the chantry chapel, a ruined ancient monument on top of the hill. This was probably a chapel of ease associated with St Nicolas Church in Guildford and was built in the early 14th century by the rector of the church, Richard de Wauncey. A five-day fair has been held here historically, licensed by King Edward II in 1308.

== Archaeology ==
In 2020 a small hole was discovered on the hill during work on the railway line between Guildford and Portsmouth, which goes through a tunnel under the hill. The cave is reported to contain several decorative niches carved into the walls of the sandstone cave, which are thought to be part of a medieval shrine dating to the 12th century.

== Art ==
The hill and chapel were depicted by the artist J. M. W. Turner (1775–1851), with engravings including some in the Tate Gallery. The watercolourist Percy Robertson (1868–1934) painted the view from the hill in 1891.
