= Mary Pennyman =

Third wife of the Quaker schismatic John Pennyman

Mary Pennyman or Mary Boreham, née Bond or Heron (1630–1701) was an English religious polemicist, and the wife of controversial dissident Quaker John Pennyman.

== Life ==
She was born on 1 May 1630 and was the daughter of Edward Heron, although another source says she was born in 1631 to Nicholas Bond of London.

Mary married the Quaker Henry Boreham (or Boreman). In 1662 she was briefly imprisoned in the aftermath of the uprising of the Fifth Monarchy men. Her husband was imprisoned "for selling religious books", and died in prison the same year, leaving Mary with three children (and pregnant with a fourth). In 1670 she gave up her business (an oil shop in Leadenhall Street, in London) and went to live with two other widows (one of whom may have been Jane Leade) in Tottenham. Whilst there, she disassociated herself from the Quakers and became associated with the mystic ex-Quaker John Pennyman, who had been disowned by George Fox and started holding his own meetings in the 1660s. By 1670 Pennyman, who had initially been married to Mary's sister (either Elizabeth Heron or Dinah Bond), was a widower.

Mary believed that she was prompted by God to move in with Pennyman in 1671. Pennyman hired a hall to feed 250 people and announced their marriage, in a ceremony widely mocked by others. The wedding feast, with 27 venison pasties and a hogshead of red wine, was the exact opposite of that advised by the Quakers and William Penn went into print to point this out. Others like Thomas and Ann Mudd remained close friends and followers.

Many of Mary's letters and writings are included in her husband's publications.

In 1672-3 the pair believed that they were prompted by God to walk through Essex and Hertfordshire. In 1691 they went to live with Pennyman's son-in-law in Bishopsgate, before moving into the country. Mary Pennyman died in 1701 after a long illness.

== Works ==
- (with John Pennyman) The Ark is begun to be opened (the waters being somewhat abated)..., 1671
- John Pennyman's Instruction to his Children, 1674
- The Quakers Rejected, 1676?
- (ed. John Pennyman) Some of the letters which were written by Mrs. Mary Pennyman, relating to an Holy and Heavenly Conversation, in which she lived to her Dying-Day, 1701–2.
