= Church of St Peter, Limpsfield =

Anglican church in Surrey, England

Coordinates: 51.2609°N 0.01231°E

Church of St Peter
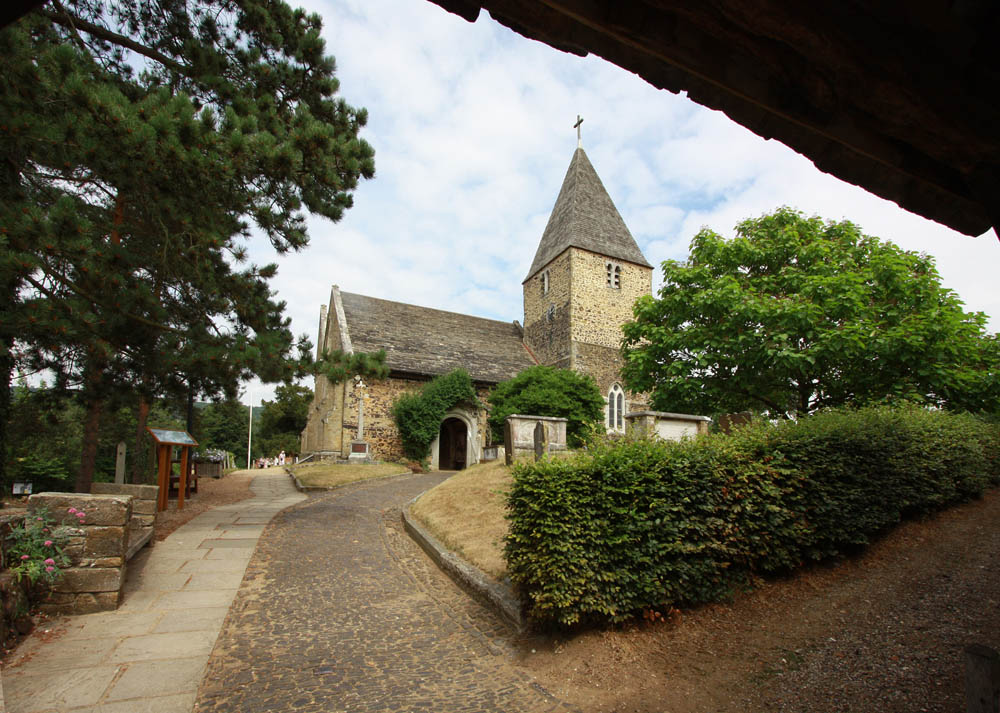

- Location: Limpsfield, Surrey
- Denomination: Church of England
- Website: https://www.stpeterslimpsfield.org/

Architecture
- Heritage designation: Grade I listed building
- Designated: 11 June 1958

Administration
- Diocese: Southwark
- Archdeaconry: Reigate
- Deanery: Tandridge

The Anglican Church of St Peter in Limpsfield, Surrey, England dates from the 12th century. It is a Grade I listed building. It is known for the number of prominent musicians buried in the graveyard, including the composer Frederick Delius and orchestra conductor Sir Thomas Beecham.

== History ==
The oldest parts of the church are the 12th-century tower, and 16th-century entrance porch. The church was substantially renovated in the 19th century.

The parish of Limpsfield and Titsey is part of the benefice of Limpsfield and Tatsfield within the Diocese of Southwark.

== Architecture ==
Constructed of ironstone rubble with stone dressings, it features a nave and two aisles, a chancel with chapel and vestry, and the tower with a peel of six bells. The nave has a Horsham slab roof, while the aisle roof is tiled. Buttresses support the gables at the west end of the church. The south west tower has tracery windows.

The interior contains a piscina and a square font. There are also a range of memorial plaques and the chest tomb of John Elphinstone, 13th Lord Elphinstone.

To commemorate the notable musicians associated with the church, St Peter's commissioned the last stained glass window produced by John David Hayward, who lived for many years in nearby Edenbridge, Kent. The window depicts Saint Cecilia, patron saint of musicians.

== Notable burials ==
The composer Frederick Delius is buried in the churchyard, near his wife Jelka. Delius had wished to be buried in his own garden in Grez-sur-Loing, near Paris, but the French authorities would not allow it. Although an atheist, his alternative wish was to be buried "in some country churchyard in the south of England, where people could place wild flowers", and his wife chose the Church of St Peter, Limpsfield.

The English orchestra conductor, Sir Thomas Beecham, a supporter of Delius, is buried nearby, as is the cellist Beatrice Harrison, who lived locally in Oxted, and who worked with both Delius and Beecham. Later, the conductor Norman Del Mar (1919-1994), appointed by Beecham as assistant conductor at the RPO is also buried there. More recently, the ashes of Jack Brymer (1915 - 2003), a leading English clarinettist are interred in the churchyard near the grave of Beecham, who had recruited him to the Royal Philharmonic Orchestra. Local resident, Dr Eileen Joyce, (1908-1991) Australian concert pianist, is also buried in the churchyard.
