= Church of St Lawrence, Chobham =

Church in Surrey, England

Coordinates: 51.3469°N 0.6032°W

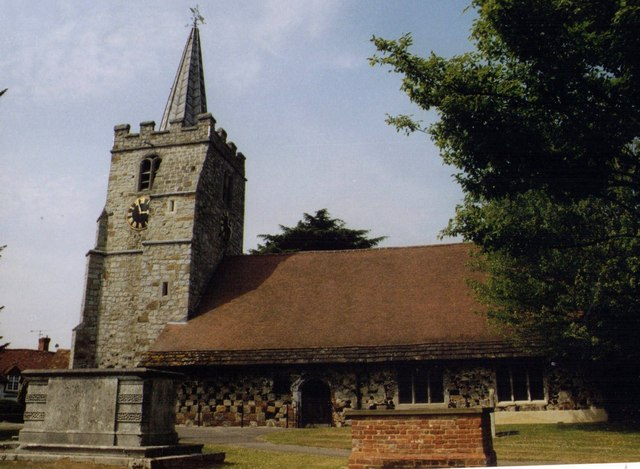
Nave and west tower of St Lawrence' parish church, Chobham, Surrey, seen from the south

St Lawrence is a Church of England church located in Chobham, Surrey. It serves the parishes of St Lawrence Chobham and St Saviour Valley End in the Diocese of Guildford. Founded in 1080, the church is listed as a grade I listed building.
