= Church of St Mary, Stanwell =

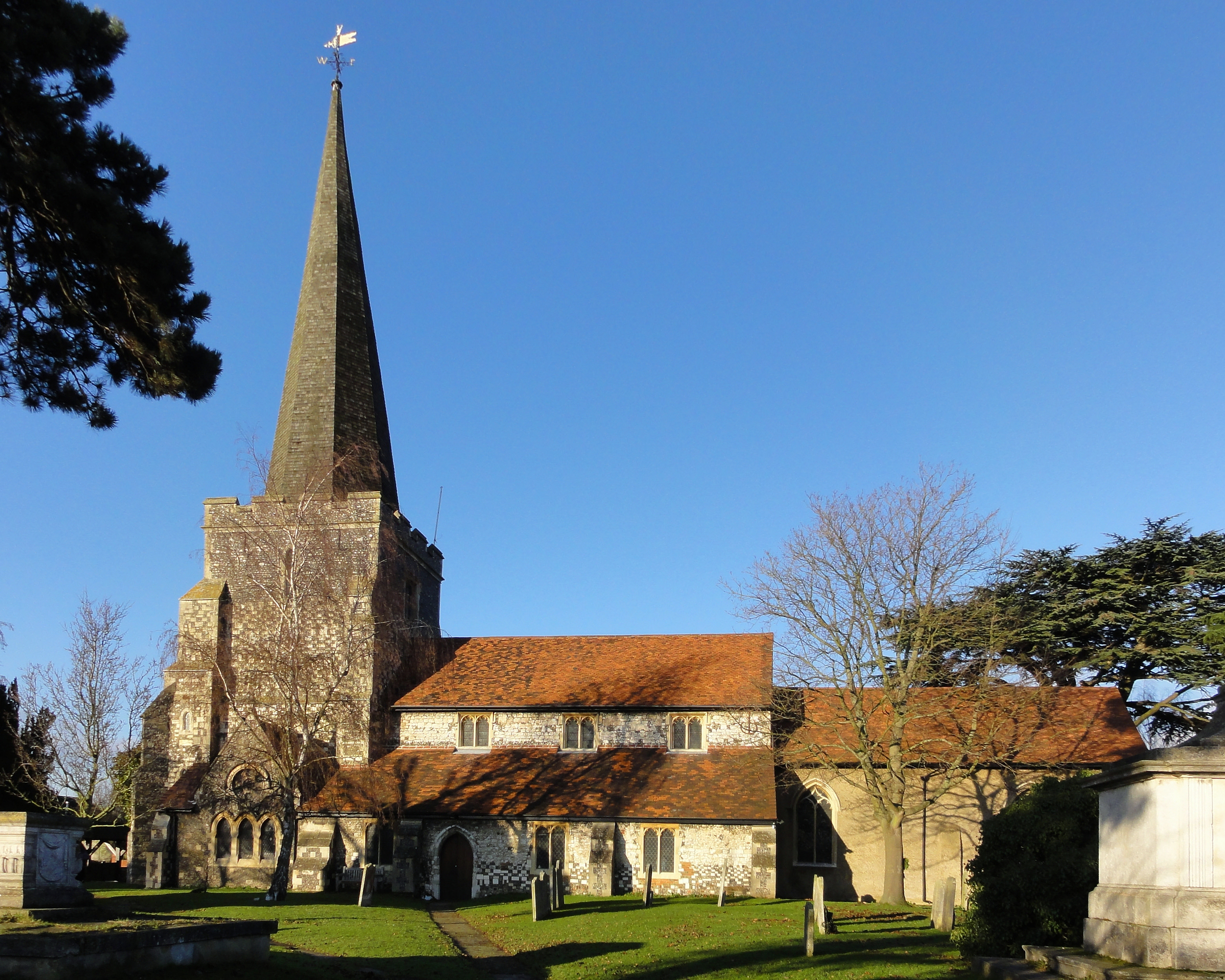

- Location within Surrey
- 51°27′23″N 0°28′48″W
- Location: Lord Knyvett Close, Stanwell, Middlesex, TW19 9PF
- Country: England
- Denomination: Church of England
- Churchmanship: Anglo-Catholic

History
- Status: Active
- Dedication: St Mary the Virgin

Architecture
- Functional status: Parish church
- Heritage designation: Grade I listed
- Designated: 11 August 1952

Administration
- Diocese: Diocese of London
- Archdeaconry: Archdeaconry of Middlesex
- Deanery: Spelthorne
- Parish: Stanwell

Clergy
- Bishop: The Rt Revd Jonathan Baker (AEO)
- Vicar: Fr Stuart King

The Church of St Mary the Virgin, Stanwell, is a Church of England parish church in the village of Stanwell, Surrey. It dates to the 12th-century and is a grade I listed building. It has Norman and Gothic architectural elements including a 14th-century spire.

== Parish ==
Stanwell parish is the west of the historic county of Middlesex. The parish was 3,934 acres (a little over 6 square miles) in 1930. Around the parish are the town of Staines, the river Colne, and Hounslow Heath. A church was endowed at Stanwell in 1204; a vicarage existed by 1254. In 1415 the advowson (patronage) of the parish was acquired by Chertsey Abbey, but returned to the Crown in 1537 with the Dissolution of the Monasteries by Henry VIII.

== History ==
Stanwell's 12th century church of St Mary the Virgin has Norman and Gothic architectural elements including a 14th-century spire.

The church contains a fine monument to Lord and Lady Knyvett. A memorial to Sir Charles Brisbane, a Royal Navy officer who served during the American War of Independence and with distinction under Lords Hood and Nelson, also lies in the chancel.

On 11 August 1952, the church was designated a grade I listed building.

=== Present day ===
The Parish of Stanwell in part of the Archdeaconry of Middlesex in the Diocese of London.

The church stands in the Anglo-Catholic tradition of the Church of England. As they reject the ordination of women, the parish is under the alternative episcopal oversight of the Bishop of Fulham (currently Jonathan Baker).

== Gallery ==
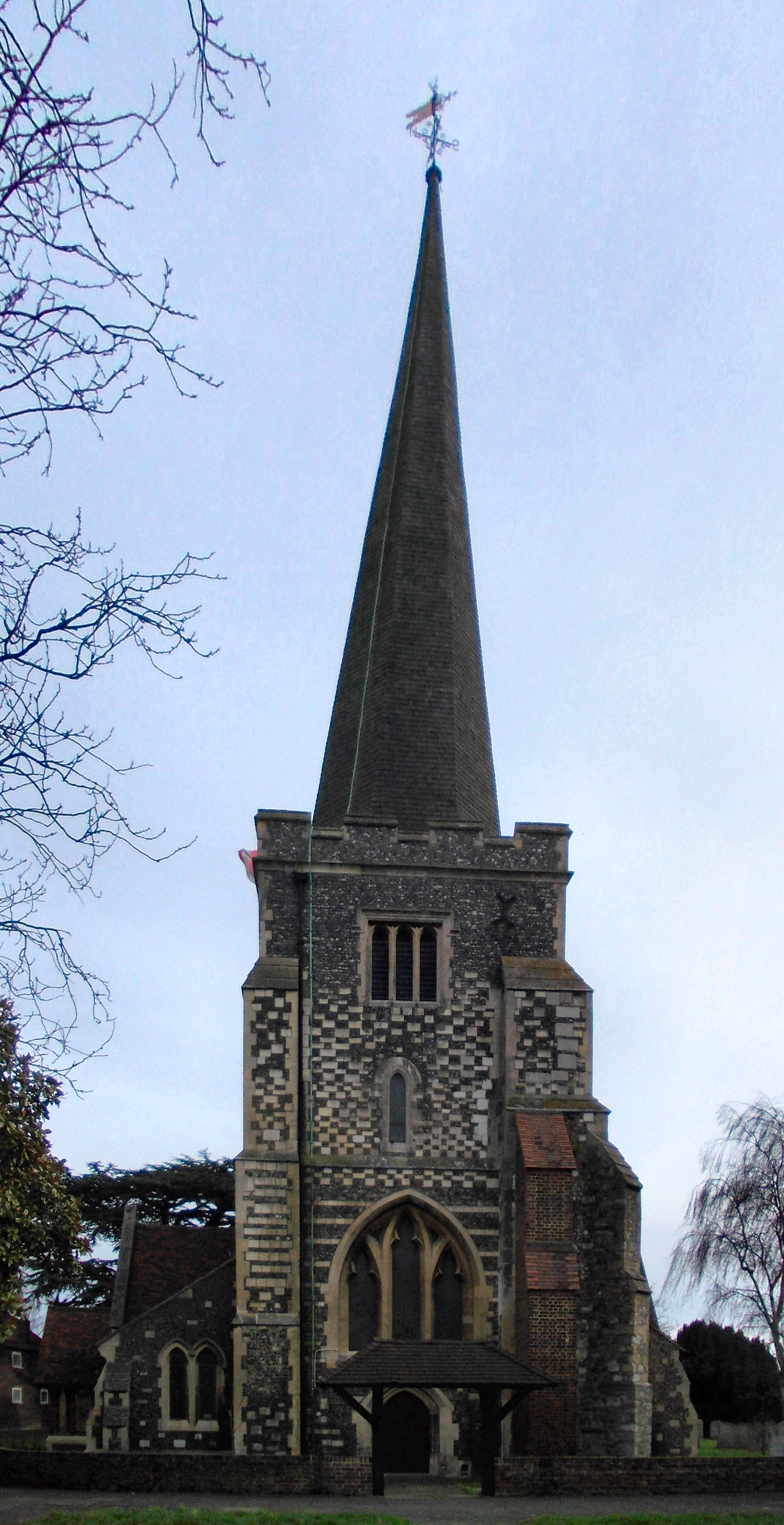
From the west, the spire is visibly not vertical

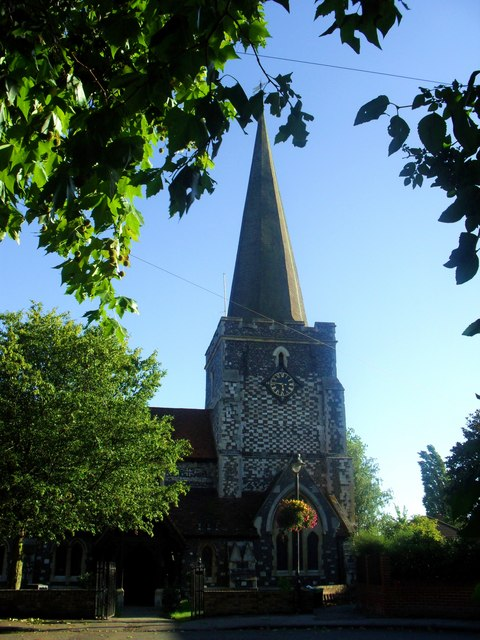
The church from the east side

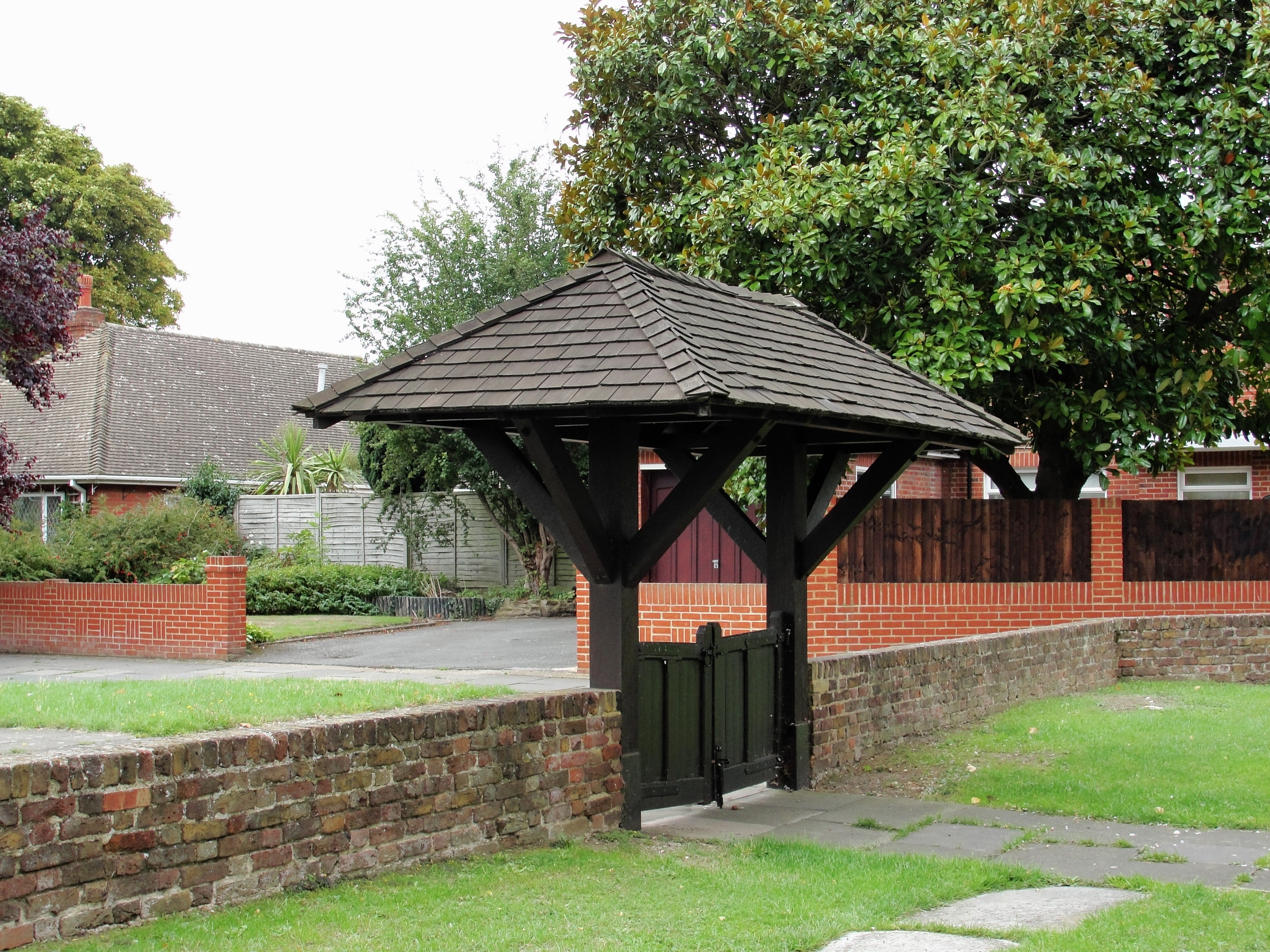
The lych gate

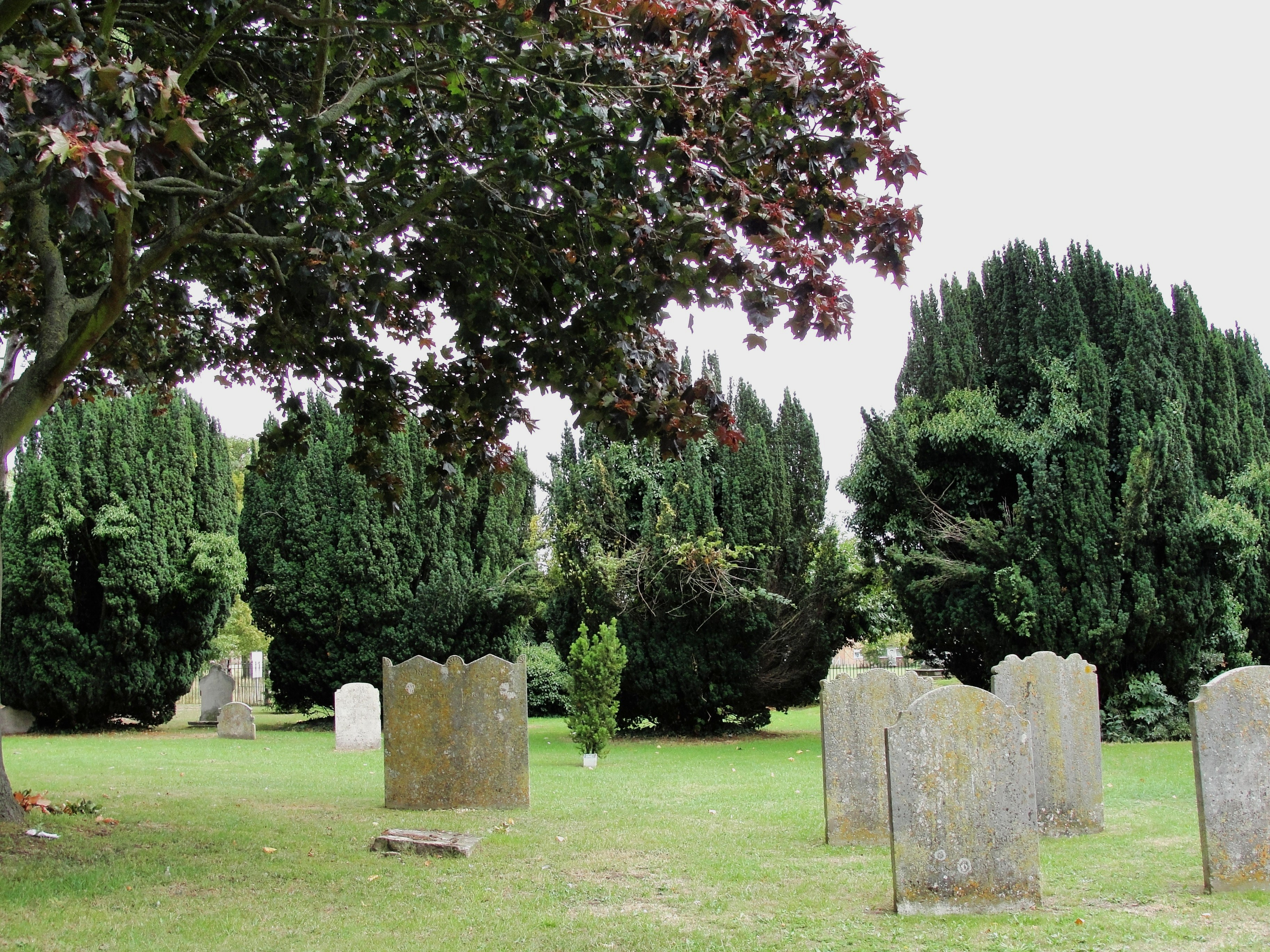
Yew trees in the churchyard

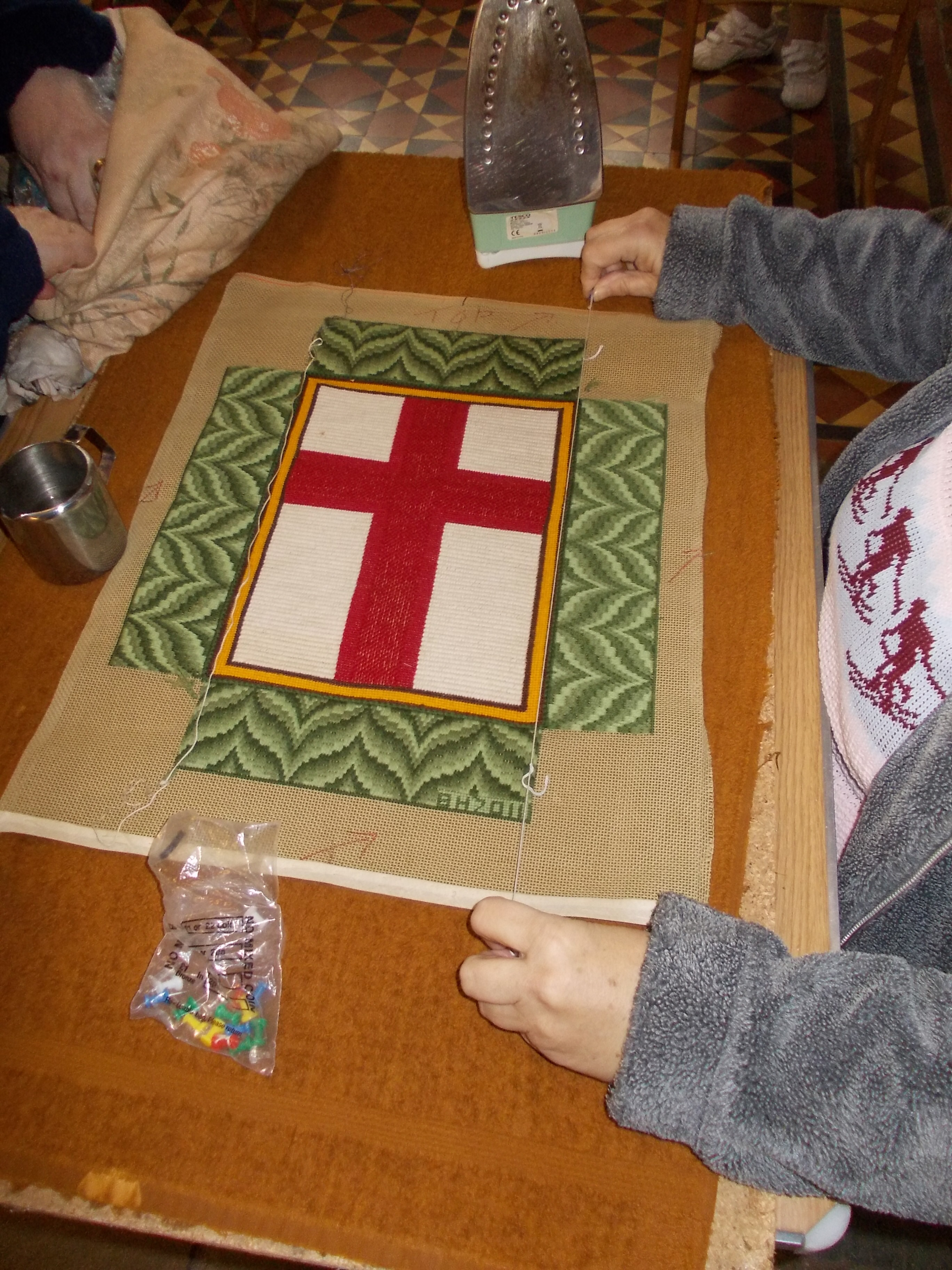
Florentine tapestry work around a St George's Cross kneeler

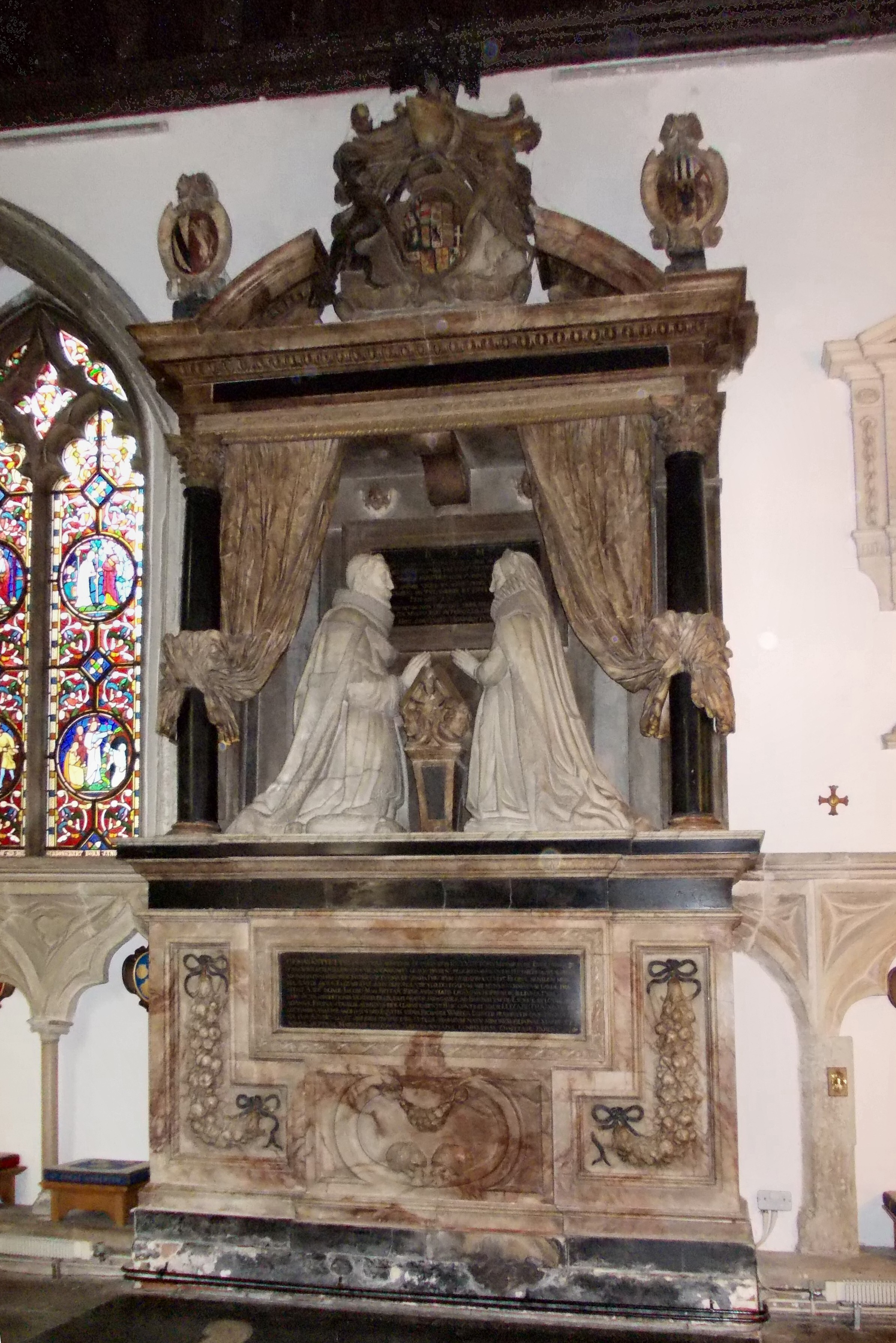
Tomb of Lord Knyvett

== Bibliography ==
- Reynolds, Susan, ed. (1962). "Stanwell Church". A History of the County of Middlesex: Volume 3: Shepperton, Staines, Stanwell, Sunbury, Teddington, Heston and Isleworth, Twickenham, Cowley, Cranford, West Drayton, Greenford, Hanwell, Harefield and Harlington. pp. 46–49.
