= Guildford Guildhall =

Municipal building in Guildford, Surrey, England

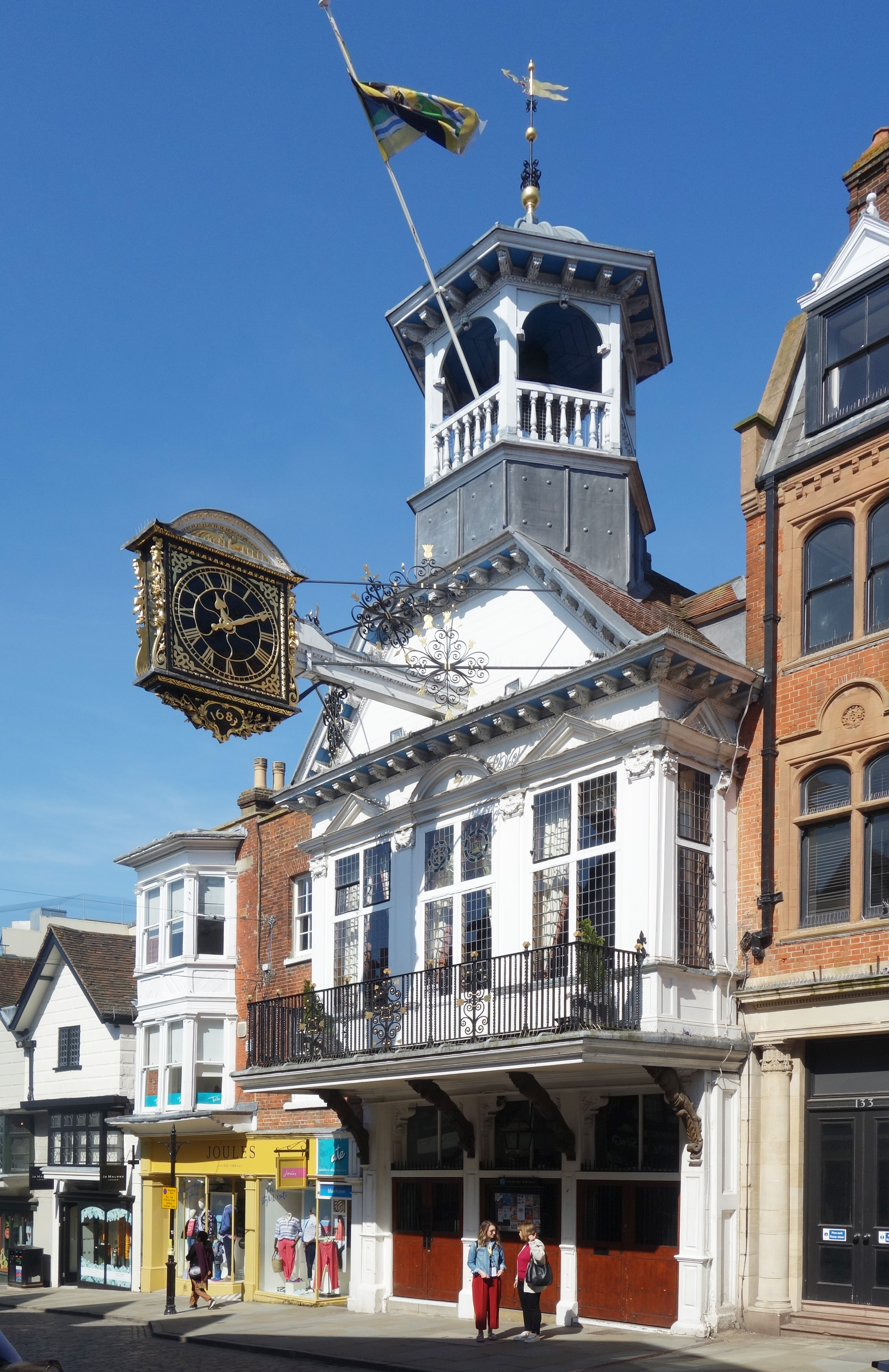

- Location within Surrey
- 51°14′09″N 0°34′20″W
- Type: Guildhall
- Location: High Street, Guildford, Surrey
- OS grid reference: SU 99764 49492

History
- Built: c. 1550

Site notes
- Architectural style: Elizabethan
- Owner: Guildford Borough Council

Listed Building – Grade I
- Official name: The Guildhall, Guildford
- Designated: 1 May 1953
- Reference no.: 1180101

The Guildford Guildhall is a Guildhall located on the High Street of the town of Guildford, Surrey. It is a Grade I listed building.

== History ==
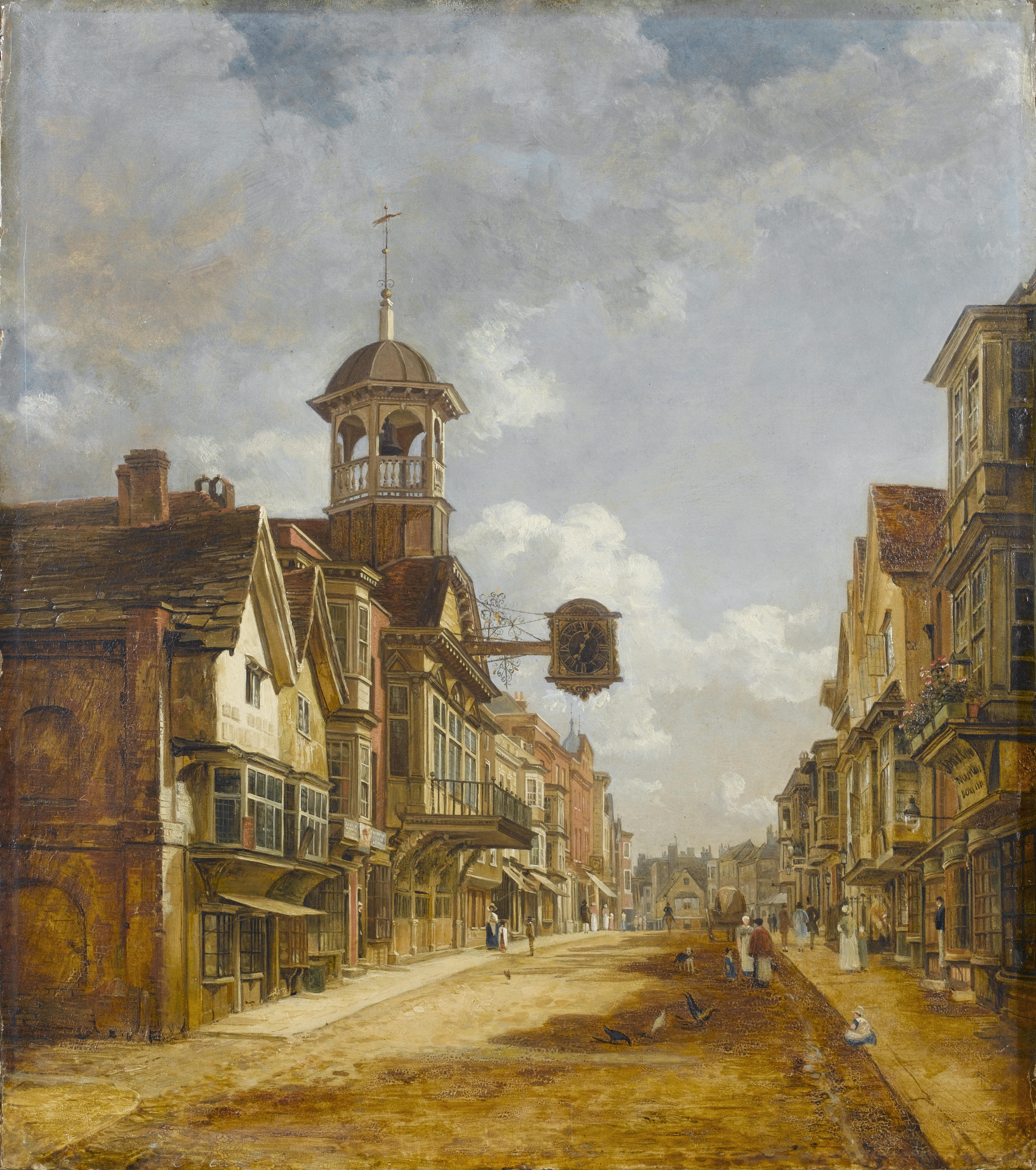
Guildford High Street, including the Guildhall, circa 1828.

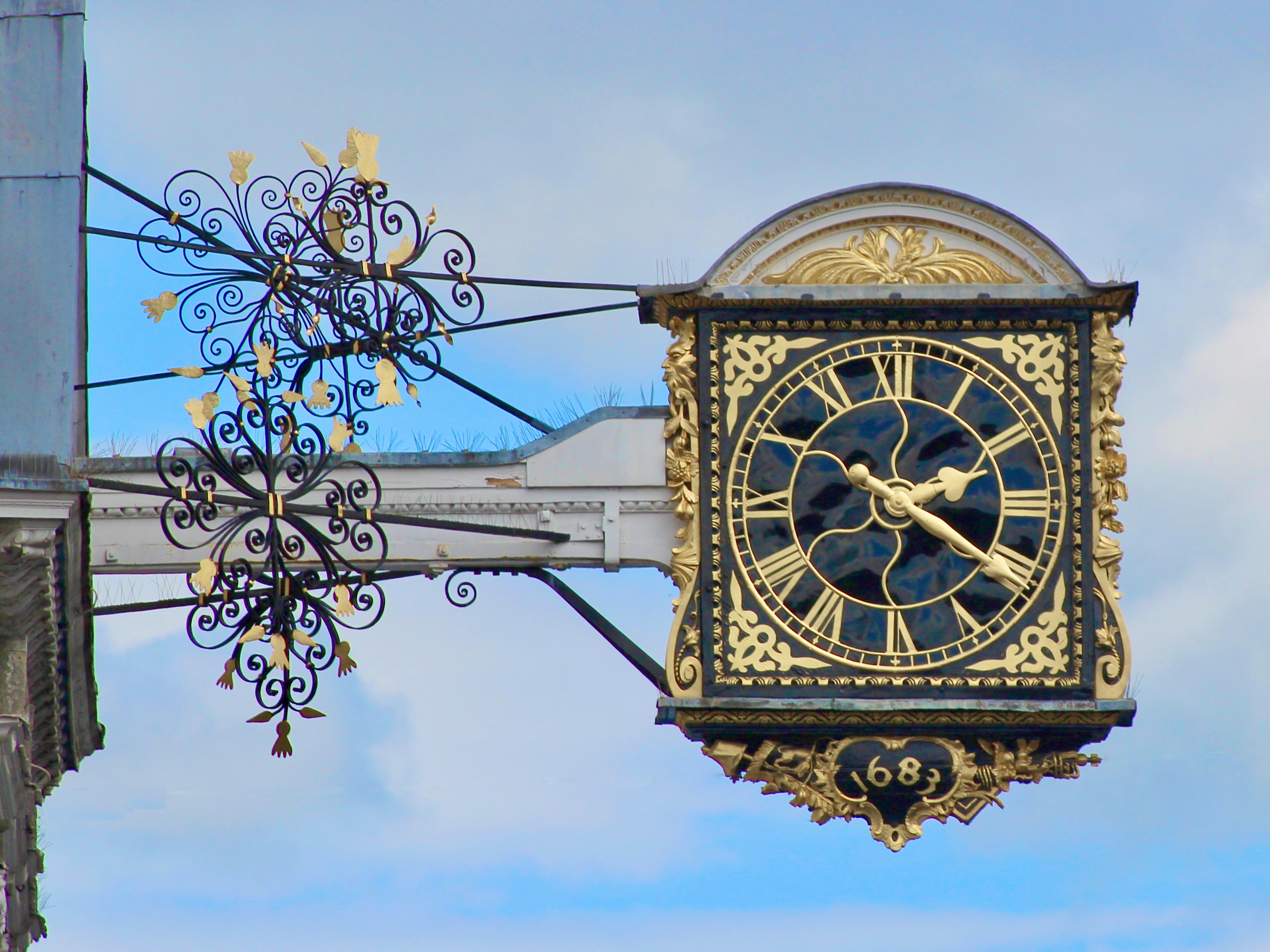
The gilded outer casing of the Guildhall clock is dated 1683

The Guildhall, which initially accommodated a market hall on the ground floor and a courtroom on the first floor, was built around 1550. It was substantially remodelled with a new facade and a new council chamber being installed on the first floor in 1683. The external design involved three doors on the ground floor, three mullion windows flanked by Ionic order pilasters augmented by a balcony with iron railings on the first floor and an ornamental cupola on the roof. The projecting clock, erected at that time, was presented to the council by a London clockmaker, John Aylward, in return for being allowed to trade in the borough.

The interior design involved a courtroom on the ground floor and a council chamber on the first floor. The panelling in the council chamber was taken from Stoughton Manor House shortly before it was demolished in the late 17th century. The ornamental cupola was replaced in 1882.

During much of the 20th century the town hall served as the meeting place of the Municipal Borough of Guildford but it ceased to be the local seat of government in 1974, when the amalgamation of the municipal borough of Guildford and Guildford Rural District to form Guildford Borough Council took place; the amalgamated Borough Council decided to hold its meetings at Millmead House.

== Art collection ==
Works of art in the Guildhall include a portrait of King James VI and I by Paul van Somer I, a portrait of King Charles II by Peter Lely and a portrait of King James II, also by Peter Lely. There are also paintings of King William III and Queen Mary II by John Riley and a painting depicting Vice-Admiral Sir Richard Onslow receiving the surrender of the Dutch flag after the Battle of Camperdown on 11 October 1797 by John Russell.

== Present ==
Guided tours of the Guildhall are conducted bi-weekly. The Guildhall is also available for private hire.

== See also ==
- Guild
- Guildhall
