= Artington =

Village and civil parish in Surrey, England

Coordinates: 51°13′11″N 0°34′50″W

- Hamlet and civil parish
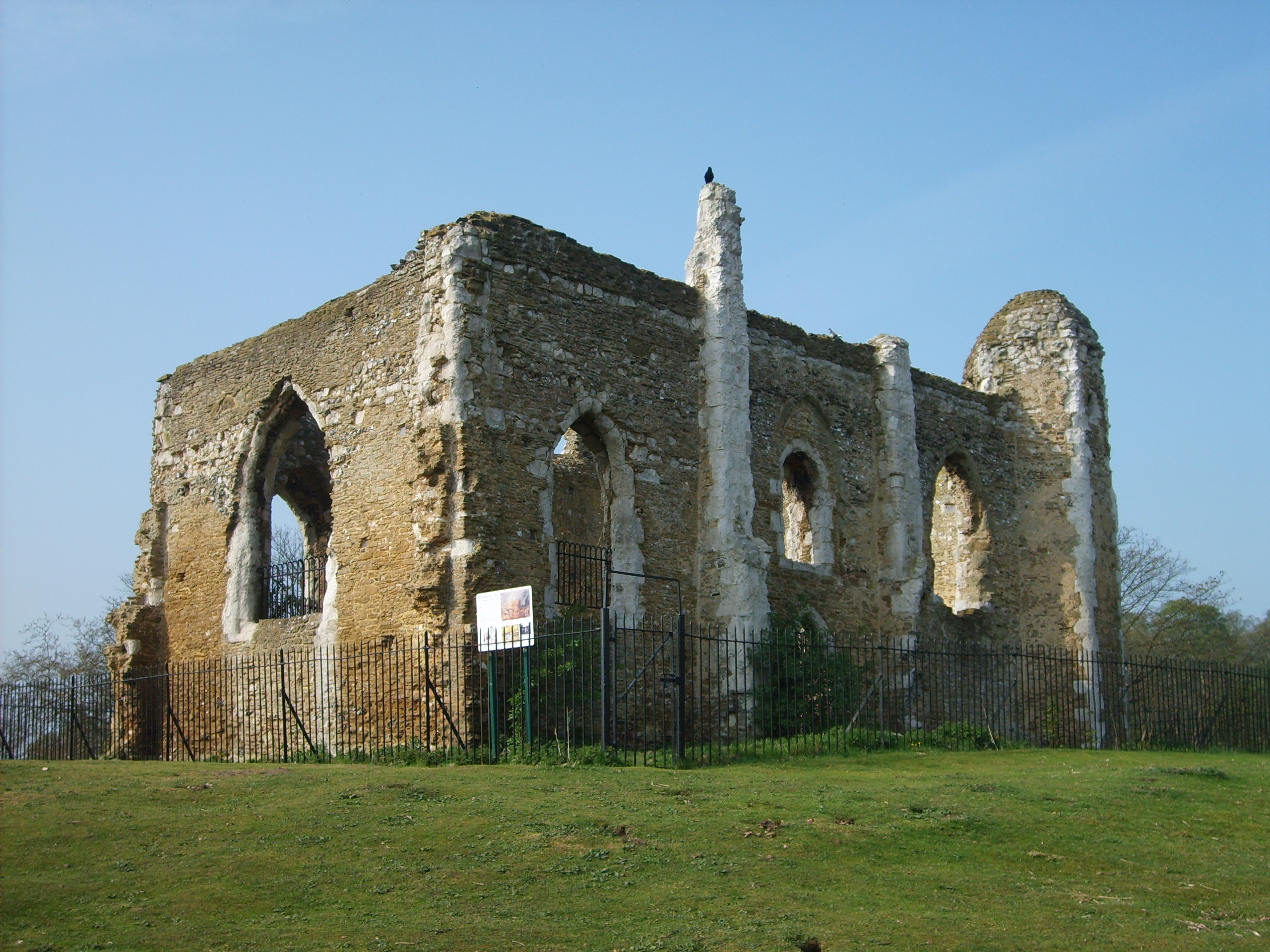
- St Catherine's Chapel is on St Catherine's Hill in the far north of the secular parish and is a ruin by the North Downs Way.

- Location within Surrey
- Area: 4.93 km^{2} (1.90 sq mi)
- Population: 359 (Civil Parish 2011)
  - Density: 73/km^{2} (190/sq mi)
- OS grid reference: SU992476
- District: Guildford
- Shire county: Surrey
- Region: South East
- Country: England
- Sovereign state: United Kingdom
- Post town: GUILDFORD
- Postcode district: GU3
- Dialling code: 01483
- Police: Surrey
- Fire: Surrey
- Ambulance: South East Coast
- UK Parliament: Godalming and Ash

Artington is a Hamlet and civil parish in the borough of Guildford, Surrey, England. It covers the area from the southern edge of the built-up centre of Guildford and steep Guildown, the start of the Hog's Back and part of the North Downs AONB, to New Pond Farm by Godalming and the edge of Peasmarsh. It contains Loseley Park, a country estate with dairy, and the hamlet of Littleton.

== Geography and history ==
Artington encompasses several farms on the west bank of the River Wey, from 1 mile (1.6 km) to 2 miles (3.2 km) south of Guildford town centre, above the ford from which came the name of Guildford. It is crossed by the North Downs Way and Portsmouth Road. A holy well lies by the ford, while the ruins of the 13th-century St Catherine's Chapel, Guildford lie just above Portsmouth Road, the main route south.

To the west and also directly south of the Pilgrims' Way are listed Braboeuf Manor, the manor house of which was rebuilt in the late 16th-century, its front dating to the 19th-century, and Mount Browne Surrey Police training headquarters. The 2011 census gave a population of 359 for the parish, an increase of 35 over 10 years, more than 10%.

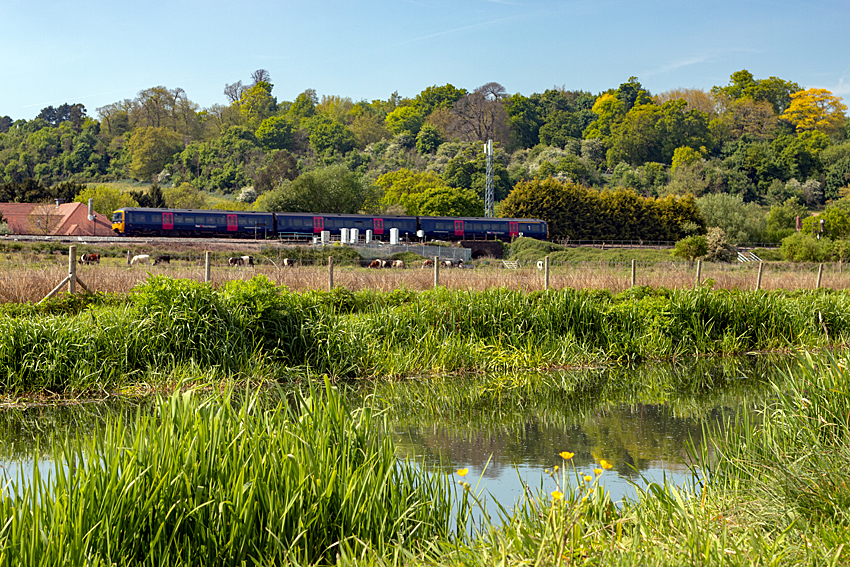
River Wey at Artington

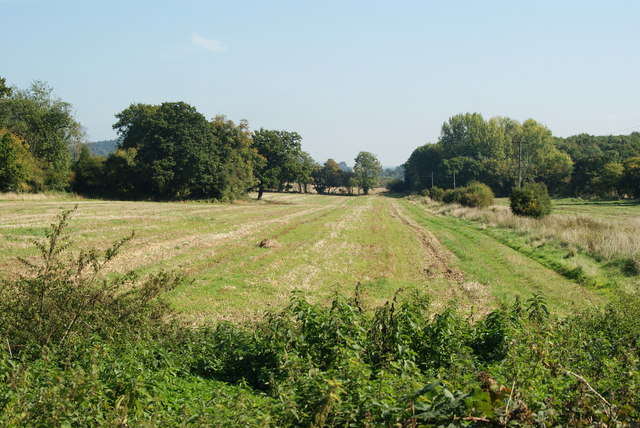
view of rural part of Artington

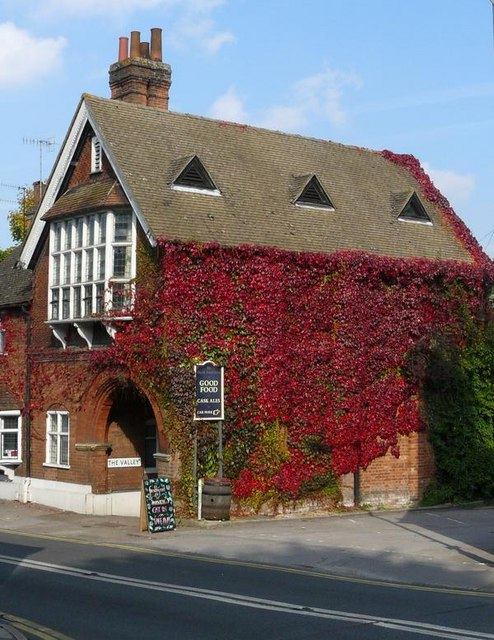
Portsmouth Road, Artington

=== Manors ===
Artington Manor was granted to the More family, later the More-Molyneux family who still own and run Loseley Park. Artington Manor Farm was the manor house, and underwent reconstruction mostly during the 18th century; it is architecturally Grade II listed. The estate is open for tours.

Braboeuf Manor held more land, including Millmead, Guildford, and was held first by Stephen de Turnham, assigning part to his daughter Alice de Bendeng. It then was held for centuries by various listed descendants named de Braboeuf, then further relatives. (Note: In brief: Danhurst, Jenyn, Loxley, Kemp and Wight, the last of whom Albert Wight (d.1905) married Jane More-Molyneux of Loseley) It was the Guildford campus of the University of Law until June 2024, when it closed after being acquired by Elysian Residences who plan to use the site as retirement apartments.

=== Former extent ===
Until shortly after 1911, the area extended over the Guildown and into Guildford Park, the area around Guildford railway station in the north and the Hog's Back marked the southern limits of Windsor Great Park, the main royal demesne in England. (Note: Taken from Artington: this old Farnham road is the "Strata de Geldedone" referred to in the Pipe rolls of 1189 as the southern boundary of the purlieu of Windsor Forest)

== Transport ==
Artington has, at its periphery on the old Portsmouth Road, the first purpose-built park and ride facility in Guildford, initially operating from a temporary car park, but later being expanded into a permanent car park with waiting room.

Shalford railway station, on the North Downs line, lies less than 300 m (980 ft) east of the eastern boundary.

The Godalming Navigation runs along the eastern border of the parish.

== Amenities ==
The place relies on adjoining Guildford for most of its amenities. It has no functional church within its bounds. The United Reformed Church is on Portsmouth Road just north of its border and the Anglican Church of St Nicholas, Guildford, has a church parish that extends into the area. The civil parish is also partly within St Michael's Church Peasmarsh's purview.

== Localities ==
=== Littleton ===
Littleton is the western settlement between Guildown hill to the north and Godalming to the south, strung along Littleton Lane.

Littleton is now a hamlet, which consists of Loseley House, Orange Court, Orange Court Farm, and a few cottages. Due to the ruin of St Catherine's Chapel mentioned and like the rest of Artington civil parish, it falls within the ecclesiastical parish of St Nicholas, Guildford and the Artington civil parish.

At the time of the Domesday Book Littleton was held by Wulwi or Wulfwi, a huntsman, who it records held it in Anglo-Saxon King Edward the Confessor's time, had two households described as a villager and a cottager and the place only rendered £1 from its assets including a ploughland for two plough teams and 2 acres (0.81 ha) of meadow.

Littleton is home to Loseley Park and Loseley House, (Note: Open to visitors see Loseley Park), an Elizabethan stately home built in 1562 by Sir William More (a direct ancestor of the current owner) at the request of Queen Elizabeth I.

=== Loseley ===
Loseley was recorded separately in the Domesday Book, when it was held of Earl Roger of Shrewsbury, as tenant-in-chief, by Turold nephew of Wigot, its adult householders comprised 7 [male] villagers, 2 slaves and 1 [male] cottager. It consisted of two ploughlands (for four plough teams) and had meadow of 5 acres (2.0 ha). Owing to the enclosed park of Loseley House, for many centuries it did not experience significant population growth.

== Demography and housing ==
The proportion of households in Artington who owned their home outright was 7.3% below the regional average. The proportion who owned their home with a loan was 5.8% lower than the regional average; providing overall a greater proportion than average of rented residential property relative to the average in Surrey, the district and the national average.

2011 Census Key Statistics
Output area	Population	Households	% Owned outright	% Owned with a loan	hectares
Artington (CP)	359	123	25.2	29.3	493

2011 Census Homes
Output area	Detached	Semi-detached	Terraced	Flats and apartments	Caravans/temporary/mobile homes	shared housing
(Civil Parish)	62	35	15	11	0	0

The average level of accommodation in the region composed of detached houses was 28%, the average that was apartments was 22.6%.

== Famous Residents ==
Mount Browne was home to the Dowager Marchioness of Sligo. (Note: This source is for the year 1911. No other inhabitants are named, when mentioning residents the source is restricted to those who had the most land and/or nobility at the time.)

== Politics ==
Local government is administered by Artington Parish Council, the Borough of Guildford and Surrey County Council.

At Guildford Borough Council the area is represented by two councillors.

Guildford Borough Councillors
Election	Member	Ward
2023	Dominique Williams	Shalford
2023	Catherine Houston	Shalford

At Surrey County Council, one of the 81 representatives represents the area within the Shalford division.

Surrey County Councillor
Election	Member	Electoral Division
2021	Matt Furniss	Shalford

== Notes and references ==
Notes
