= John Pennyman =

Quaker schismatic (1628–1706)

John Pennyman (14 August 1628 – 2 July 1706) was an English schismatic or pseudo-Quaker.

== Origins ==
John Pennyman was the fourth son of Sir James Pennyman (died 1655) of Ormesby, Yorkshire, by his second wife, Joan Smith (died 1657) of London. His half-brother, Sir James Pennyman (1609–1679), was knighted by Charles I at Durham in 1642, raised a troop of horse for the King's service in the Civil War at his own expense, and was created a baronet by Charles II on 22 February 1664. (Note: Calendar of State Papers, Domestic, 1663, 1664, pp. 475, 492.)

== Early beliefs ==
John was born at Ormesby on 14 August 1628. He entered the King's service at fifteen as ensign in the foot regiment of which Sir James was colonel. Upon the defeat of the Royalist army, John and two brothers took refuge abroad until their father and eldest brother had made their composition with the Parliament. John was apprenticed on 8 February 1647 to a Mr. Fabian, a wool-draper in London, also a zealous Royalist. In 1651 he attended the Fifth-Monarchy services of Christopher Feake at Christ Church, Newgate Street, but about 1658, after Feake's committal to Windsor Castle, he joined the Quakers. He was one of the 164 who, in 1659, offered 'to lie body for body' for those in prison. Within some two years he grew dissatisfied with them, and held meetings on his own account in the fields and woods two or three miles from London, although still attending the business meetings of the Quakers, and 'standing by them in their sufferings'. He was successful in business, and owned houses and shops 'at the west end of St. Pauls', which he congratulated himself on having demolished shortly before the Great Fire. His wife and family resided at Kentish Town. On 1 September 1666 he saw the fire break out, and removed 'almost all his goods and some of his neighbours'.

== Separation from the Friends ==
Pennyman's religious opinions took a very mystical turn, and caused George Fox and his saner followers much anxiety. He claimed a special portion of 'the inner light' which directed the smallest details of his life. He saw visions, fasted for days together, and more than once went to meeting to experience a kind of euthanasia—standing on a form with 'his breath and sences taken from him for about half or quarter of an hour'. (Note: Autobiography.) He printed and distributed protests against the Friends, at Devonshire House, Wheeler Street, Horselydown, Bull and Mouth, Ratcliff, and other meetings. His eccentricities reached a climax on 28 July 1670, when the Quaker books which he had collected 'began to be an oppression'. Carrying them to the Royal Exchange, he set them on fire, and a constable thereupon carried him before Sir Thomas Bludworth (Lord Mayor in 1666). He was committed to Bishopsgate Prison, and later to Newgate. The next day, 29 July, George Whitehead wrote to him that 'by his mad and wicked action he had brought a great reproach upon Friends, the devil having instigated him to burn their books'. He defended himself in a letter to his brother, which was printed and given away at the Exchange. On 10 August the Quakers issued a paper declaring that they had no longer union or fellowship with Pennyman, whom they considered 'in a measure broken and discomposed in his mind and understanding'. This Pennyman caused to be reprinted in red with a broad black border, and he distributed it widely. Through the influence of his brother and nephew he was soon released.

== Marriages ==
Pennyman's first wife, Elizabeth, had died, aged 24, at Aldersgate Street, on 24 February 1667–8, of fever, and was buried in the Friends' burial-ground at Chequer Alley. She left five children. His second wife, Dinah, daughter of Nicholas Bond of Pall Mall, St. James's, died on 23 August 1669 at her father's house, and was also buried at Chequer Alley. After her death Pennyman took her sister Mary (born 1631), widow of Henry Boreman, to his house in Aldersgate on 10 October 1671. Boreman was a Quaker who had died in Newgate Prison on 17 October 1662. Mary Boreman, who had been living since at Tottenham with other widows, had dissociated herself from the Quakers, and held views resembling those of the Philadelphians. (Note: See Jane Lead.) Immediately after she had taken up her quarters at his house, Pennyman engaged Merchant Taylors' Hall, and, in obedience to a 'command', invited all sects, and prepared food and drink for 250 persons, not to celebrate, but to announce his so-called marriage with the widow. William Penn protested that such proceedings were not 'plain, public, and orderly, such as are owned and practised by the people called quakers'. A scurrilous ballad, 'Ye Quaker's Wedding', was sung in the streets. (Note: Letter from Rebecca Travers to Margaret Fell, 5 November 1671, Swarthmore MSS.) Pennyman and his new wife visited Essex and Hertfordshire on foot together during the winter of 1672–3, in obedience 'to special motions'. In January 1691–1692 he and his family went to live with John Barkstead, his son-in-law, at St. Helen's, Bishopsgate; but in October 1695 he was so ill that he gave directions for his burial, and wrote his epitaph. He recovered and moved to the country, where writings of Sir Matthew Hale fell into his hands, from which he had extracts printed, and distributed twenty thousand copies.

== Later life and death ==
Mary Boreman died, after some years of sickness, on 14 January 1701. Shortly after he published Some of the Letters and Papers which were written by Mrs. Mary Pennyman, relating to an Holy and Heavenly Conversation, in which she lived to her Dying Day, London, 10 March 1701–2. In August 1703 he finished A Short Account of the Life of Mr. John Pennyman, which, with some of his writings (relating to Religious and Divine Matters), are to be made Publik for the Weal and Benefit of all Mankind, London, 1703. A second edition appeared, with an appendix also by him, dated 31 October, and More Mementoes, 8 December 1705. Some more letters and papers, with an account of his death, which took place on 2 July 1706, were added by another hand. He was buried at Bunhill Fields on 9 July 1706.

== Writings ==
Pennyman wrote a great number of small tracts, broadsides, and papers against the Quakers, which he copiously distributed. The chief are:

- The Quakers challenged [of Solomon Eccles] answered by a stripling of the Lamb's Army, London, 1680–1.
- The Quakers unmasked. Their double dealing and false-heartedness discovered, 1682, reprinted 1693: A General Epistle of Love and Goodwill to all Professors of Christianity.

With Mary Boreman he wrote:

- The Ark is begun to be opened (the waters being somewhat abated) which, with some Papers and Passages given forth by the Lord's Servants, I am thus to Publish. Who am made a Living Witness of the Spirit's Teaching; which worship is so Pure that I may not endeavour to gather any Proselites thereto, &c., London, 1671.
- John Pennyman's Instruction to his Children, London, 1674.
- The Quakers Rejected [1676].

== See also ==
- Pennyman baronets

== Bibliography ==
- Besse, Joseph (1753). A Collection of the Sufferings of the People Called Quakers. Vol. 1. London: L. Hinde. Chap. XXV. p. 389.
- Leachman, Caroline L. (2004). "Pennyman, John (1628–1706), Quaker schismatic". In Oxford Dictionary of National Biography. Oxford University Press.
- Penn, William (1726). A Collection of the Works of William Penn. In Two Volumes. Vol. 2. London: J. Sowle. p. 223.
- Pennyman, James Worsley, ed. (1904). Records of the Family of Pennyman of Ormesby. York: John Sampson. pp. 5, 27.
- Smith, Charlotte Fell (1895). "Pennyman, John" . In Lee, Sidney (ed.). Dictionary of National Biography. Vol. 44. London: Smith, Elder & Co. pp. 338–340.
- The Inscriptions and Epitaphs in the Bunhill-fields Burial-ground, with Alphabetical Index: Reprinted from a volume published in 1717, in the possession of … Charles Reed. 1867. p. 13.
