= After the Deluge (painting) =

Oil painting by George Frederic Watts

- The Forty-First Day
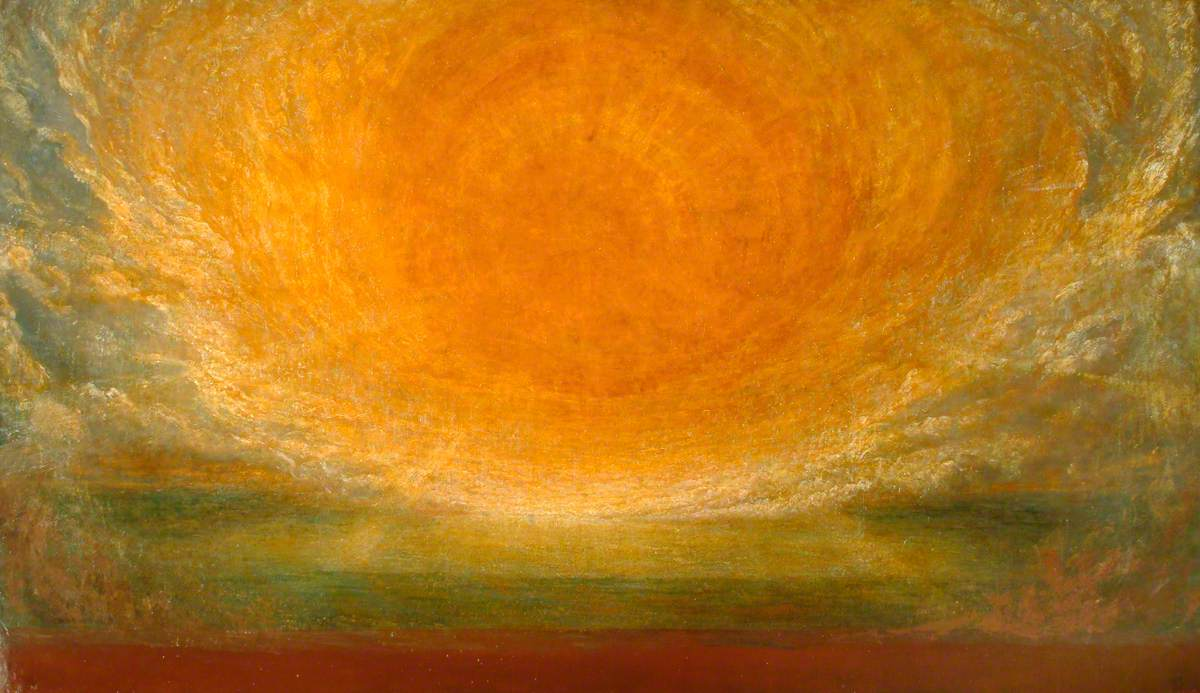
- Artist: George Frederic Watts
- Year: 1886–1891
- Type: Oil
- Dimensions: 142.2 cm × 111.8 cm (56.0 in × 44.0 in)
- Location: Watts Gallery; Compton, Surrey

After the Deluge, also known as The Forty-First Day, is a Symbolist oil painting by English artist George Frederic Watts, first exhibited as The Sun in an incomplete form in 1886, and completed in 1891. It shows a scene from the story of Noah's Flood, in which after 40 days of rain Noah opens the window of his Ark to see that the rain has stopped. Watts felt that modern society was in decline owing to a lack of moral values, and he often painted works on the topic of the Flood and its cleansing of the unworthy from the world. The painting takes the form of a stylized seascape, dominated by a bright sunburst breaking through clouds. Although this was a theme Watts had depicted previously in The Genius of Greek Poetry in 1878, After the Deluge took a radically different approach. With this painting he intended to evoke God in the act of creation, but avoid depicting the Creator directly.

The unfinished painting was exhibited at a church in Whitechapel in 1886, under the intentionally simplified title of The Sun. Watts worked on the painting for a further five years, and the completed version was exhibited for the first time at the New Gallery in 1891. Between 1902 and 1906 the painting was exhibited around the United Kingdom, and it is now in the collection of the Watts Gallery in Compton, Surrey. As Watts did not include After the Deluge in his gift to the nation of what he considered his most significant works, it is not among his better-known paintings. However, it was greatly admired by many of Watts's fellow artists, and has been cited as an influence on numerous other painters who worked in the two decades following its initial exhibition.

== Background ==
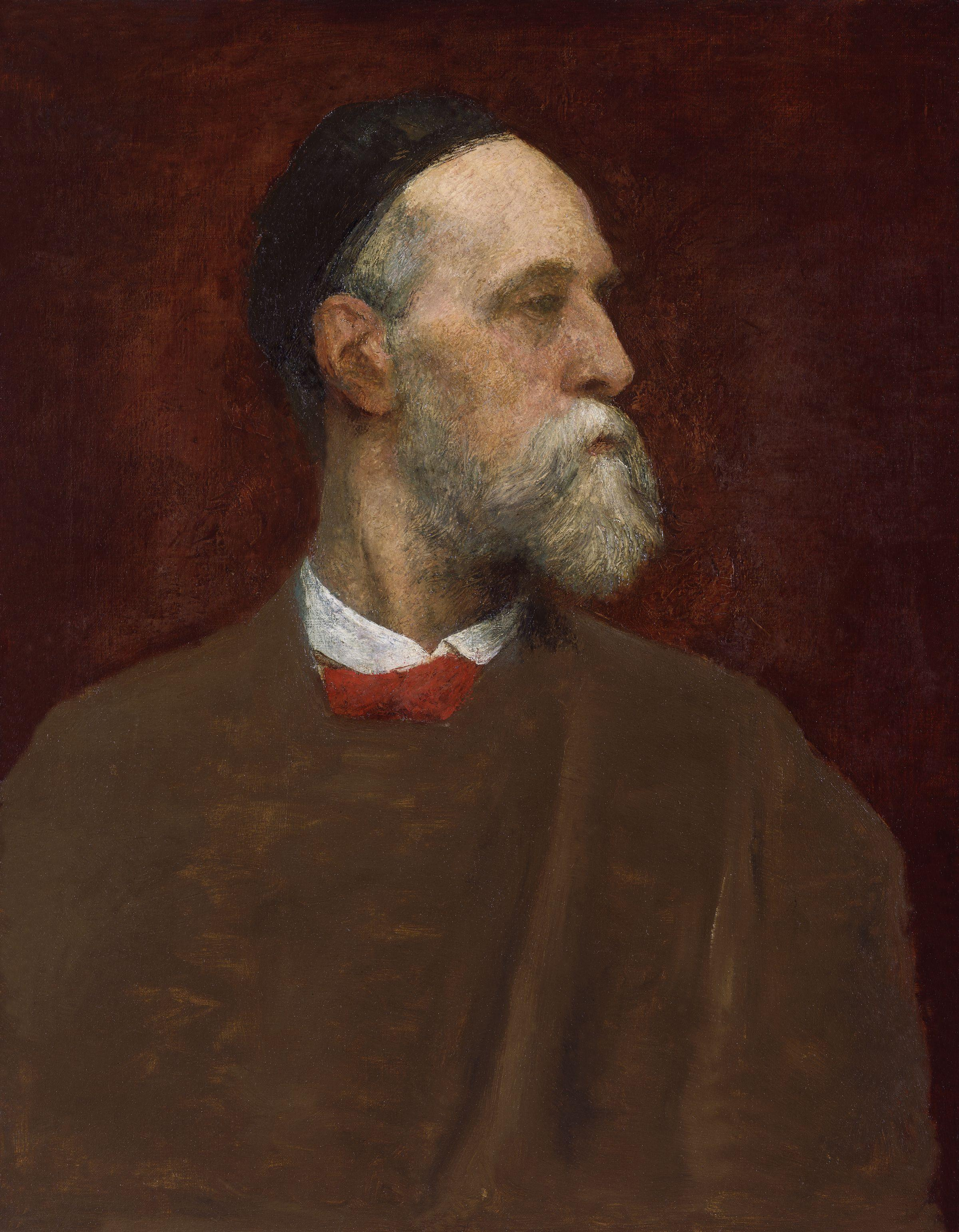
George Frederic Watts, c. 1879

George Frederic Watts was born in 1817, the son of a London musical instrument manufacturer. His two brothers died in 1823, and his mother in 1826, giving Watts an obsession with death that lasted throughout his life. Watts was apprenticed as a sculptor at the age of 10, and by his mid-teens was proficient enough as an artist to be earning a living as a portrait painter. At the age of 18 he gained admission to the Royal Academy of Arts, although he disliked their methods and his attendance was intermittent. From 1837, Watts was successful enough to devote himself full-time to painting.

In 1843 Watts travelled to Italy where he remained for four years. On his return to London he suffered from melancholia, and painted many notably gloomy works. His skills were widely celebrated, and in 1856 he decided to devote himself to portrait painting. His portraits were highly regarded, and in 1867 he was elected to the Royal Academy, at the time the highest honour available to an artist, (Note: In Watts's time, honours such as knighthoods were bestowed only on presidents of major institutions, not otherwise on even the most well respected artists. In 1885 serious consideration was given to raising Watts to the peerage; had this happened, he would have been the first artist thus honoured. In the same year, he refused the offer of a baronetcy.) although he rapidly became disillusioned with its culture. From 1870 onwards he became widely renowned as a painter of allegorical and mythical subjects; by this time, he was one of the most highly regarded artists in the world. In 1881 he added a glass-roofed gallery to his home at Little Holland House, which was open to the public at weekends, further increasing his fame.

== Subject ==
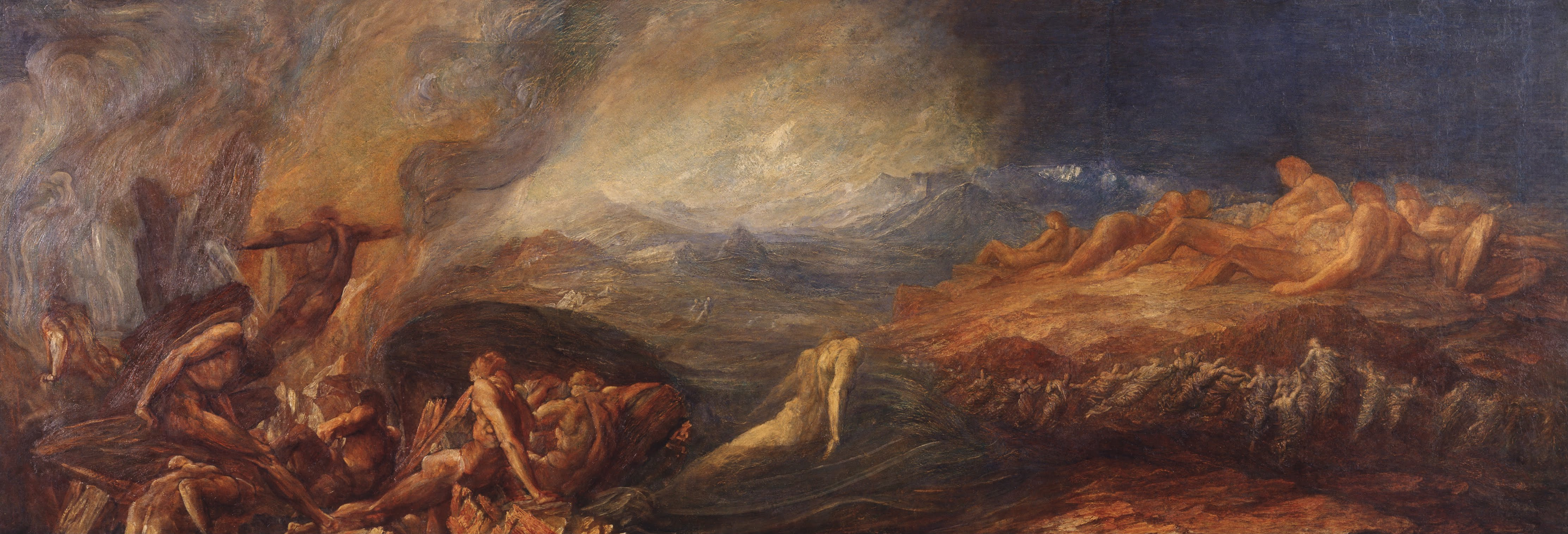
Chaos by George Frederic Watts (exhibited 1882) (Note: Chaos was based on an 1845 watercolour by Watts of the view of the Apuan Alps at Carrara from the top of the Leaning Tower of Pisa. The right-hand section of Chaos, depicting resting giants and dancing women, was originally a separate painting called The Titans (exhibited 1875).)

After the Deluge depicts a scene from the story of Noah's Flood, in which Noah opens the window of the Ark to see that after forty days the rain has ended but the floodwaters have not yet subsided. Although his father's strict evangelical Christianity had instilled in Watts a strong dislike of organised religion, he had a deep knowledge of the Bible, and Noah and the Flood were both themes he regularly depicted throughout his career.

Watts had a strong belief in the idea that modern society was prioritising wealth over social values, and that this attitude, which he described as "the hypocritical veiling of the daily sacrifice made to this deity", was leading to the decline of society. Hilary Underwood of the University of Surrey writes that Watts likely painted so many works on the theme of Noah as he saw modern parallels with the notion of the cleaning of a degenerate society while preserving those who still adhered to moral standards. Watts chose to depict the moment at which the sunlight became visible for the first time, after 40 days obscured by clouds.

And the waters decreased continually until the tenth month: in the tenth month, on the first day of the month, were the tops of the mountains seen. And it came to pass at the end of forty days, that Noah opened the window of the ark which he had made.

— Genesis 8:5–6

== Composition ==
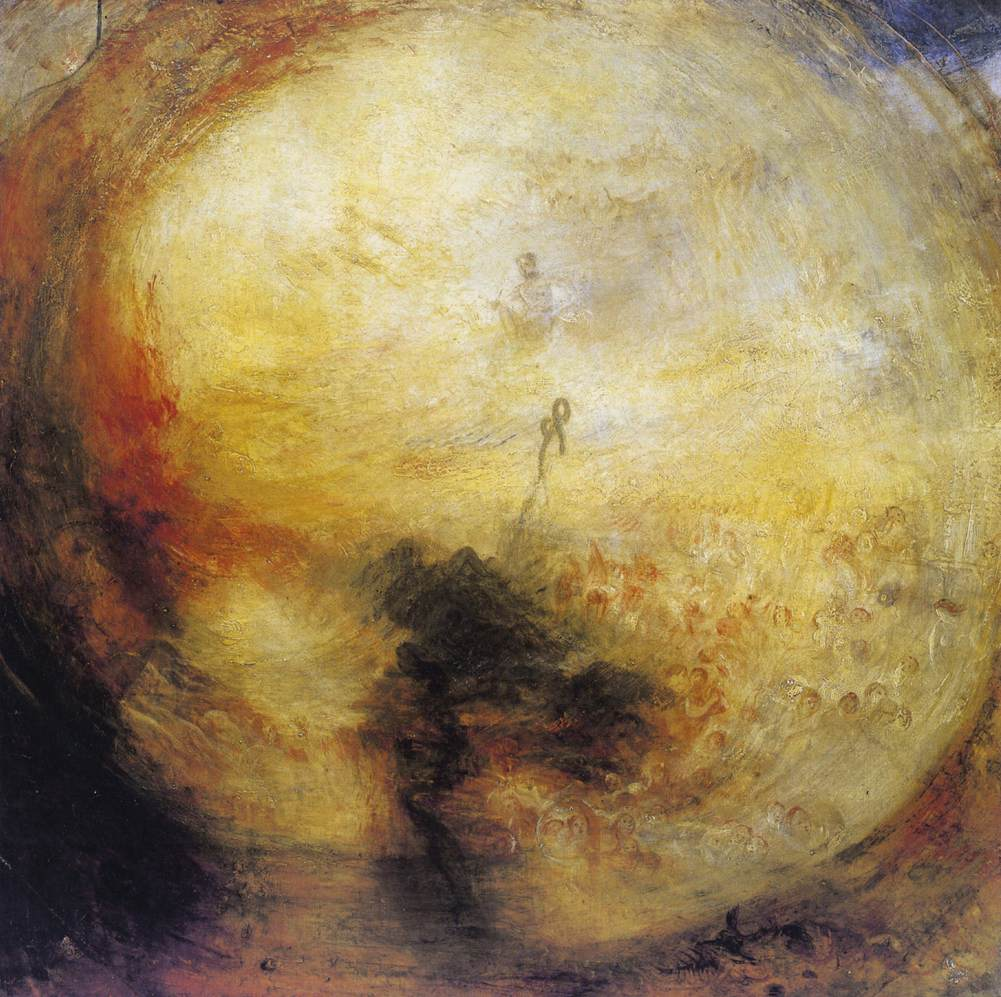
Light and Colour by J. M. W. Turner, 1843

Watts illustrated the scene with a highly stylised seascape. Above the sea is a bright sunburst, with the light of the sun illuminating the surrounding clouds and bright rays projecting beyond the edges of the canvas. Watts's composition echoes J. M. W. Turner's 1843 treatment of the same topic, Light and Colour (Goethe's Theory) – The Morning after the Deluge – Moses Writing the Book of Genesis, in primarily depicting a circle of bright light. However, Turner's painting depicts recognisable human figures, and no work by Turner ever came as close to pure abstract art as Watts's composition.

In this stage of his career Watts regularly painted images linking awe-inspiring natural events and the will of God. His focus on the Sun reflects his longstanding interest in it as a divine symbol; The Sacrifice of Noah, painted c. 1865, showed Noah sacrificing to the sun in thanks for his family's salvation. This interest in the Sun possibly came from Watts's acquaintance Max Müller, who had written extensively on solar theories of mythology (the belief that the religions of Europe, the Middle East and southern Asia were all ultimately derived from Proto-Indo-European worship of the Sun). Writing after Watts's death, his widow Mary Seton Watts wrote that:

A visitor looking at After the Deluge remarked that into such a scheme of colour he felt it would not have been impossible to introduce the figure of the Creator. 'Ah no,' Mr Watts replied. 'But that is exactly what I could wish to make those who look at the picture conceive for themselves. The hand of the Creator moving by light and by heat to re-create. I have not tried to paint a portrait of the sun—such a thing is unpaintable—but I wanted to impress you with the idea of its enormous power.'

— Mary Seton Watts, writing c. 1910.

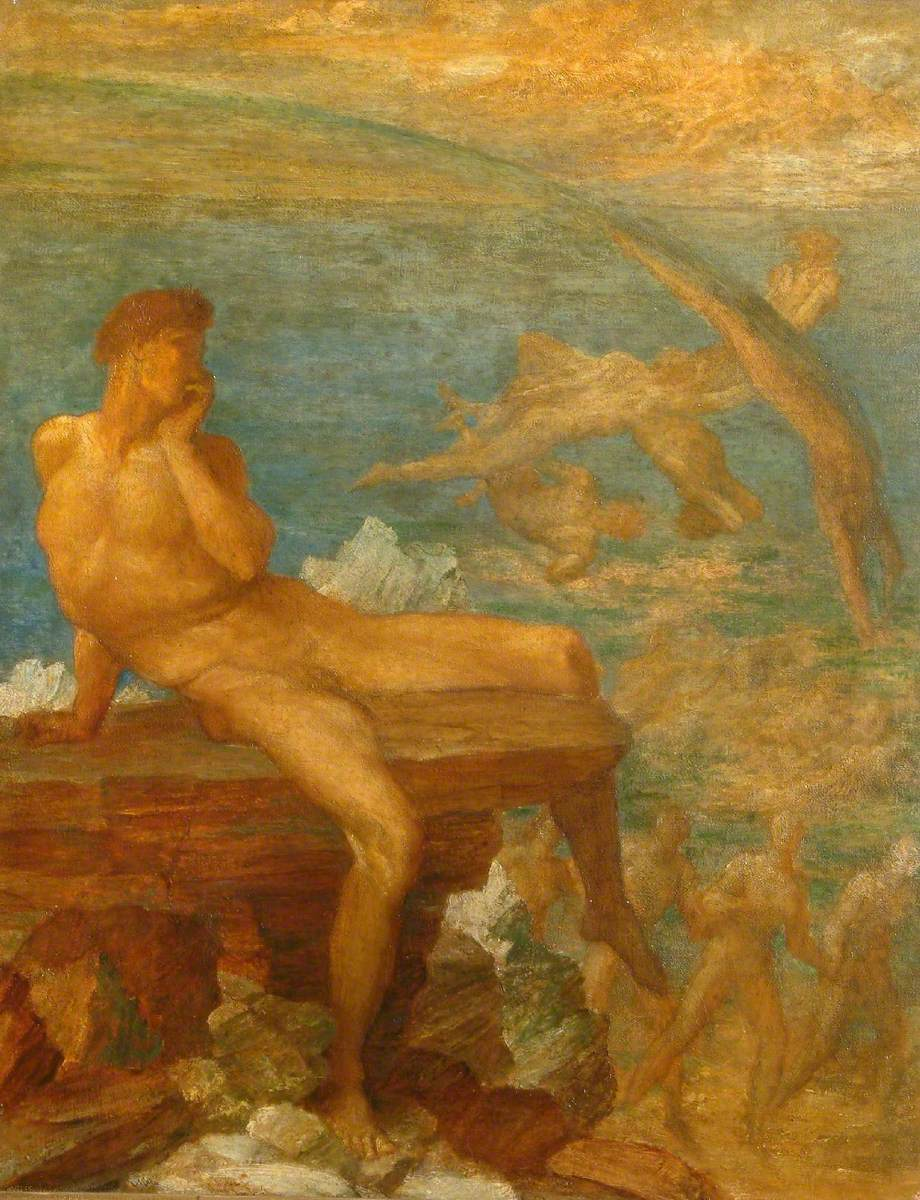
The Genius of Greek Poetry by George Frederic Watts, 1878

Watts had previously depicted an orange sun above a flat sea in his 1878 work The Genius of Greek Poetry, (Note: Watts began work on The Genius of Greek Poetry in 1856 following a visit to Halicarnassus, but did not complete it until 1878.) but the theme and composition of After the Deluge was radically different. The Genius of Greek Poetry was intended to evoke pantheism, with figures representing the forces of nature in human form working and playing, while being watched by the large central figure of the Genius. After the Deluge was explicitly intended as a monotheistic image, evoking both the magnificence and the redemptive mercy of a single all-powerful God engaging in the act of creation.

After the Deluge was exhibited in unfinished form in 1886 as The Sun at St Jude's Church, Whitechapel; (Note: Samuel and Henrietta Barnett considered themselves 'missionaries of civilisation', and the exhibitions they organised in Whitechapel were specifically aimed at the uneducated. Watts often gave his works simplified titles when exhibiting them at these exhibitions.) Samuel Barnett, vicar of St Jude's, organised annual art exhibitions in east London in an effort to bring beauty into the lives of the poor; he had a close relationship with Watts, and regularly borrowed his works to display them to local residents. (Note: Barnett decorated the front of St Jude's with a large mosaic of Watts's Time, Death and Judgement.) Following this exhibition Watts continued to work on the painting for a further five years.

== After completion ==
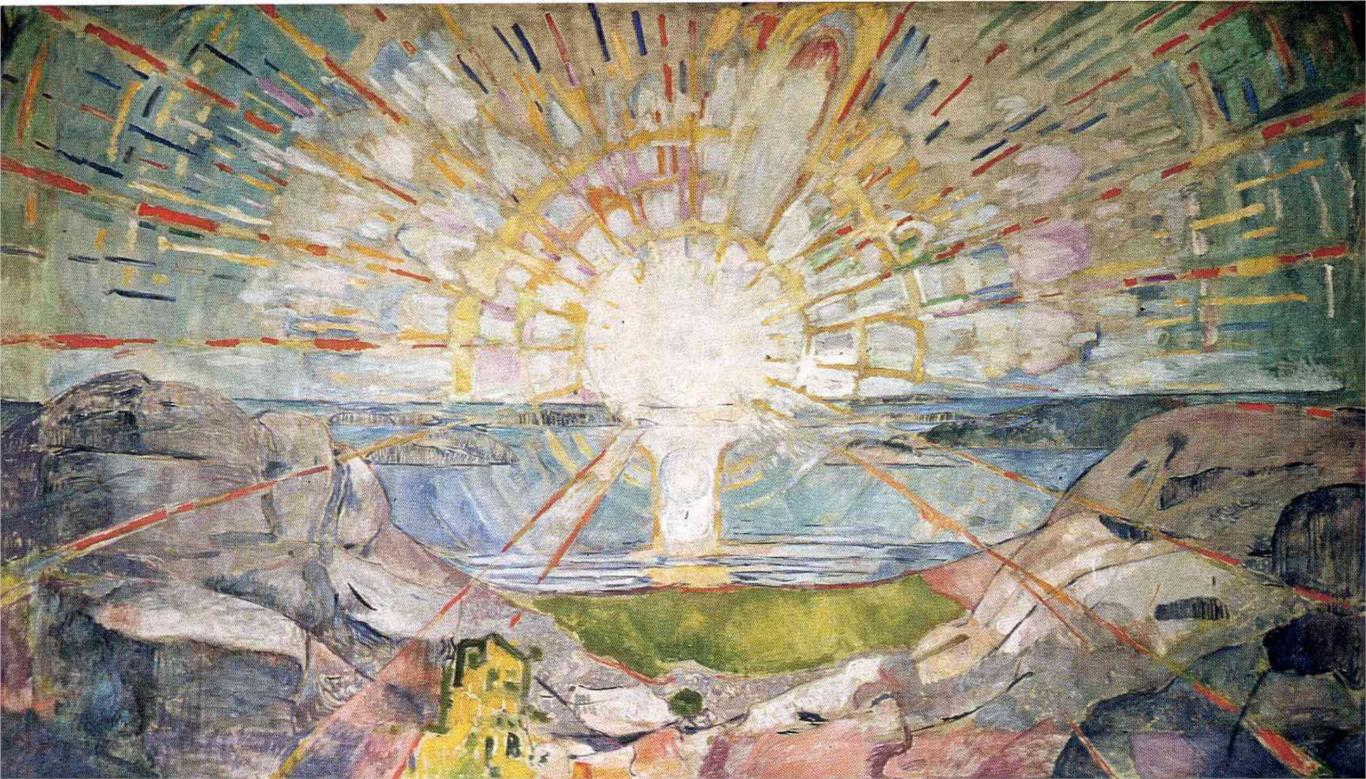
The Sun by Edvard Munch, 1911

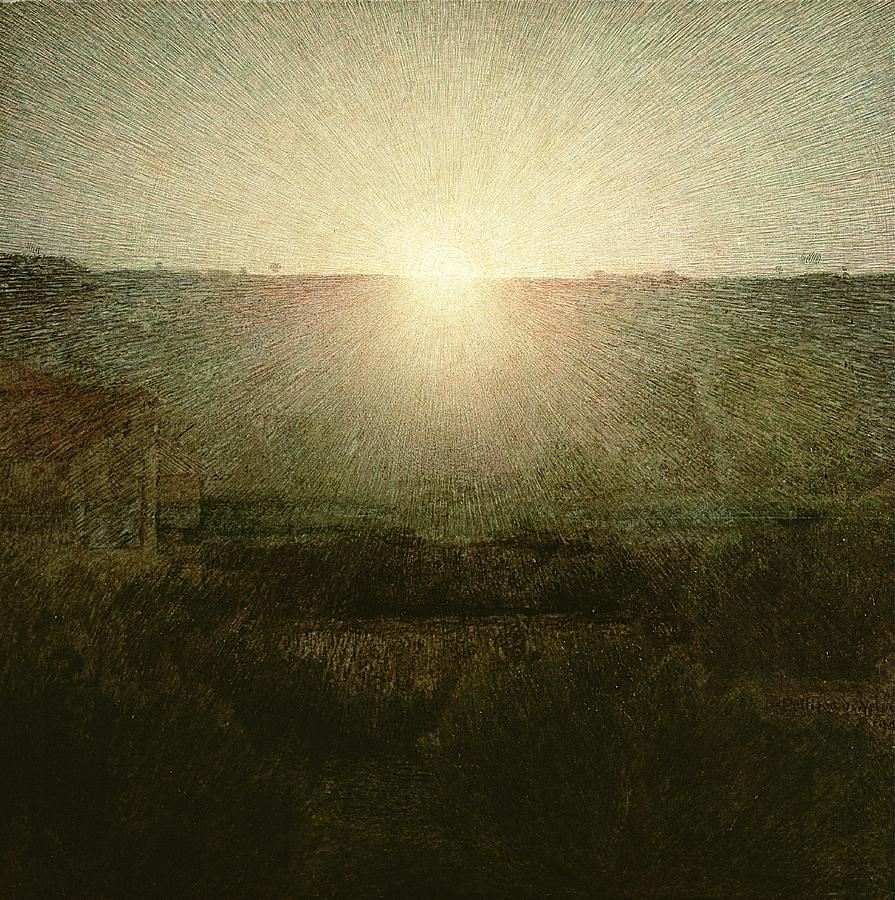
The Rising Sun by Giuseppe Pellizza da Volpedo, 1904

The completed version of After the Deluge was exhibited at the New Gallery in 1891. On the occasion of its 1891 exhibition and at a later exhibition in 1897, also at the New Gallery, it was accompanied by an explanatory note (thought to have been written by Watts) explaining the image:

A transcendent power of light and heat bursts forth to re-create; darkness is chased away; the waters, obedient to the higher law, already disperse into vapoury mists and pass from the face of the earth.

— Note accompanying After the Deluge on its exhibitions at the New Galleries. (Note: The author of the explanatory text is not recorded, but it is believed to have been written by Watts.)

Between 1902 and 1906 it was exhibited around the country, being shown in Cork, Edinburgh, Manchester and Dublin, as well as at Watts's own gallery at Little Holland House. In 1904 it was transferred to the newly opened Watts Gallery in Compton, Surrey, shortly before Watts's death later that year. Two years prior to this, Watts had returned to the theme of creation with The Sower of the Systems, which for the first time in one of his works directly depicted God, and which he described as representing "a great gesture into which everything that exists is woven".

Although Watts painted landscapes throughout his life, he did not consider such paintings to be major works, and when between 1886 and 1902 he donated what he felt to be his 23 most significant non-portrait works to the nation for public display, no landscape paintings were included. (Note: From 1883 onwards, Watts donated his significant portrait paintings to the National Portrait Gallery. In 1886, he donated what he felt at the time were his nine most significant paintings to the South Kensington Museum (now the Victoria and Albert Museum). The latter nine paintings along with nine others were given to the newly formed National Gallery of British Art (later the Tate Gallery, now Tate Britain) on its formation in 1897, with five more works later donated by Watts during his lifetime. The 23 works Watts donated to the Tate Gallery were The All Pervading, Chaos, Clytie, The Court of Death, Death Crowning Innocence, Dray Horses, Dweller in the Basement, Eve Repentant, Eve Tempted, Faith, For He Had Great Possessions, Hope, Jonah, Love and Death, Love and Life, Love Triumphant, Mammon, The Messenger, The Minotaur, She Shall Be Called Woman, Sic Transit, Spirit of Christianity and Time, Death and Judgement.) As a consequence of its omission from these gifts to the nation, After the Deluge is not among his better-known works, although it was greatly admired by many of Watts's fellow artists. Walter Bayes wrote in 1907 that After the Deluge was "the sort of landscape that we connect with the name of Mr Watts, a landscape from which all that is coarse and material has been eliminated, and which offers a residuum that is a kind of sublimation of all the most poetic elements in nature". It has been cited as an influence on many works painted in the two decades following its completion, including paintings of the sun by Maurice Chabas, Giuseppe Pellizza da Volpedo and Edvard Munch. After the Deluge remains in the collection of the Watts Gallery.
