= Compton Potters' Arts Guild =

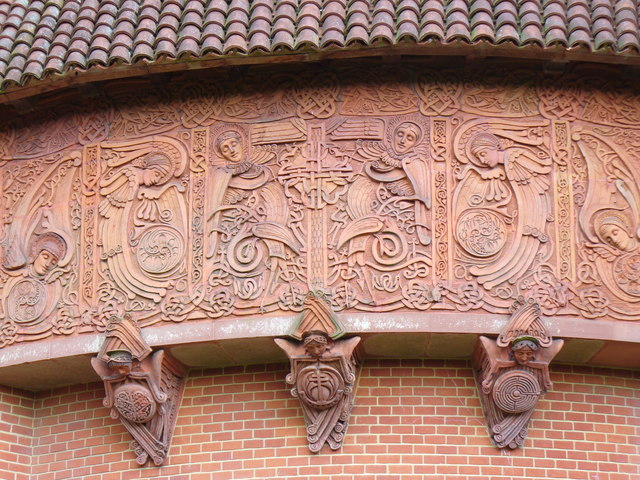
Detail of the external architectural terracotta reliefs designed by Mary Fraser Tytler for the Watts Mortuary Chapel. These were made before the Compton Potters' Arts Guild was formally set up, but many of the same people were involved.

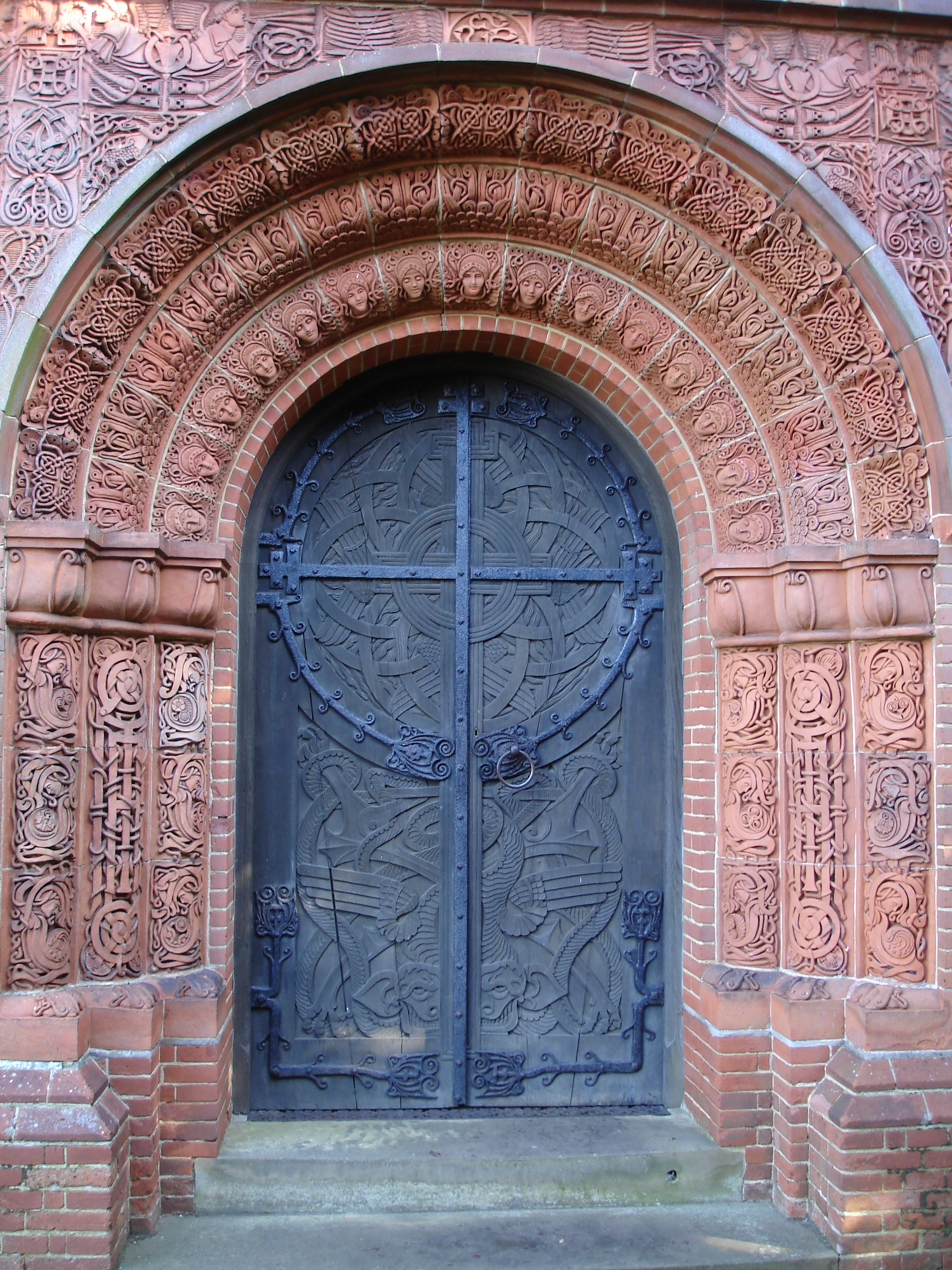
The doorway of the Watts Mortuary Chapel

The Compton Potters' Arts Guild was an art pottery, founded by and based at the Surrey home of Scottish artist, Mary Fraser Tytler.

== Background ==
A follower of the Home Arts and Industries Association, set up by Earl Brownlow in 1885 to encourage handicrafts among the lower classes, Fraser-Tytler, the wife of Victorian era painter and sculptor George Frederic Watts, had offered to design and build a new mortuary chapel when the council in Compton, Surrey were developing a new cemetery. Setting up a local evening class, led by Louis Deuchars, Mary got them designing and modelling designs guided by her and influenced by friends and crafts people: Edward Burne-Jones, Walter Crane, Alexander Fisher, William De Morgan and Phoebe Traquair.

The resultant Romanesque/Celtic revival exterior of the Watts Mortuary Chapel aroused such interest, that before work on the polychrome interior had started, Watts had set up permanent Arts and Crafts communities in both Compton and her home-town of Aldourie, Scotland. The outputs of the Compton group resulted in the formation in 1899 of the Compton Potters' Arts Guild.

== Production ==
The innovative terracotta garden ornaments produced by the evening class group, recommended by Gertrude Jekyll, expanded into a production centre of mainly Gothic Revival, Arts and Crafts and latterly Art Nouveau style pottery, with many of its designs involving Celtic knots. The pottery's output was extensive, from large terracotta garden pottery to smaller household figures, jugs, plaques and pendants. In Green Lane cemetery, Farnham, there is a Compton Pottery memorial to May Margaret Barber, widow of Charles Burton Barber, the Victorian artist.

After World War I, many pairs of bookends were made including Archers, Sunburst, Galleon, Fruit and Flowers. The majority of the pottery was made from a soft white body and decorated with tempera, an egg-based paint susceptible to wear and which washes off.

Its designs and products were featured by many London shops, including Liberty & Co. One of its potters was featured in the first BBC filler intermission film, the well known 'Potter's Wheel'.

After the death of its founder, the Guild continued until 1954, by which time competition from more modern designs had severely reduced its sales.
