= Louis Deuchars =

Scottish artist and sculptor

Louis Reid Deuchars (1870–1927) was a Scottish artist and sculptor.

== Life ==
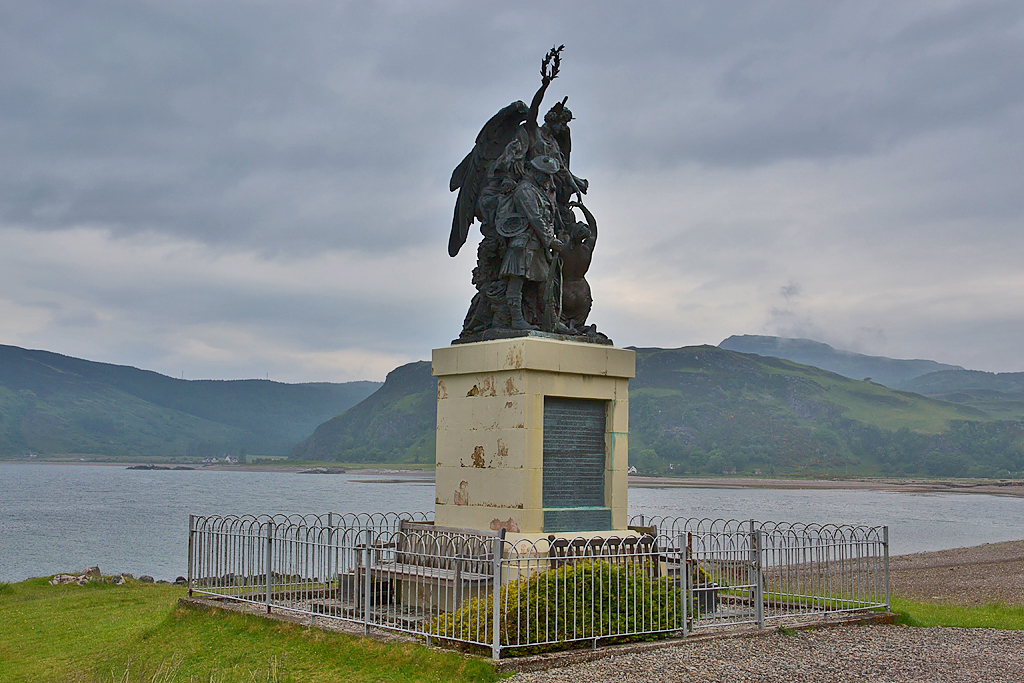
The Glenelg War Memorial by Deuchars

He was born on 12 April 1870 in Comrie, Perthshire, Scotland.

He attended Glasgow School of Art from 1887 to 1888. During his time in the city he was working as a stained-glass painter, possibly for a firm of decorators, such as J & W Guthrie. His series of lithographs, 'Picturesque Glasgow' was published in 'The Bailie' (1893–95). After sending a selection of his drawings to George Frederic Watts, 'England's Michelangelo', Deuchars secured work as an assistant to Watts at Compton, Surrey, England, where he worked on Watts' sculptures Physical Energy and Lord Tennyson. However, his main employment there was as one of the four main workers assisting Mrs Watts, Mary Fraser Tytler, with her Watts Mortuary Chapel from 1895 to 1900. He helped her to run the classes attended by the local villagers, who modelled the decorative terra cotta tiles for the chapel. Then he went on in 1900 to do the same job at the Aldourie Pottery, Dores, her enterprise in the Highlands. It was near her childhood home of Aldourie Castle, Inverness-shire. During his association with the Wattses, he learned how to submit works to major art exhibitions & sold several.

Following that he was assistant to the sculptor Sir William Goscombe John in St John's Wood, London. Then he moved to be assistant to another sculptor, William Robert Colton at Hughenden, near High Wycombe.

== Deuchars in Edinburgh ==
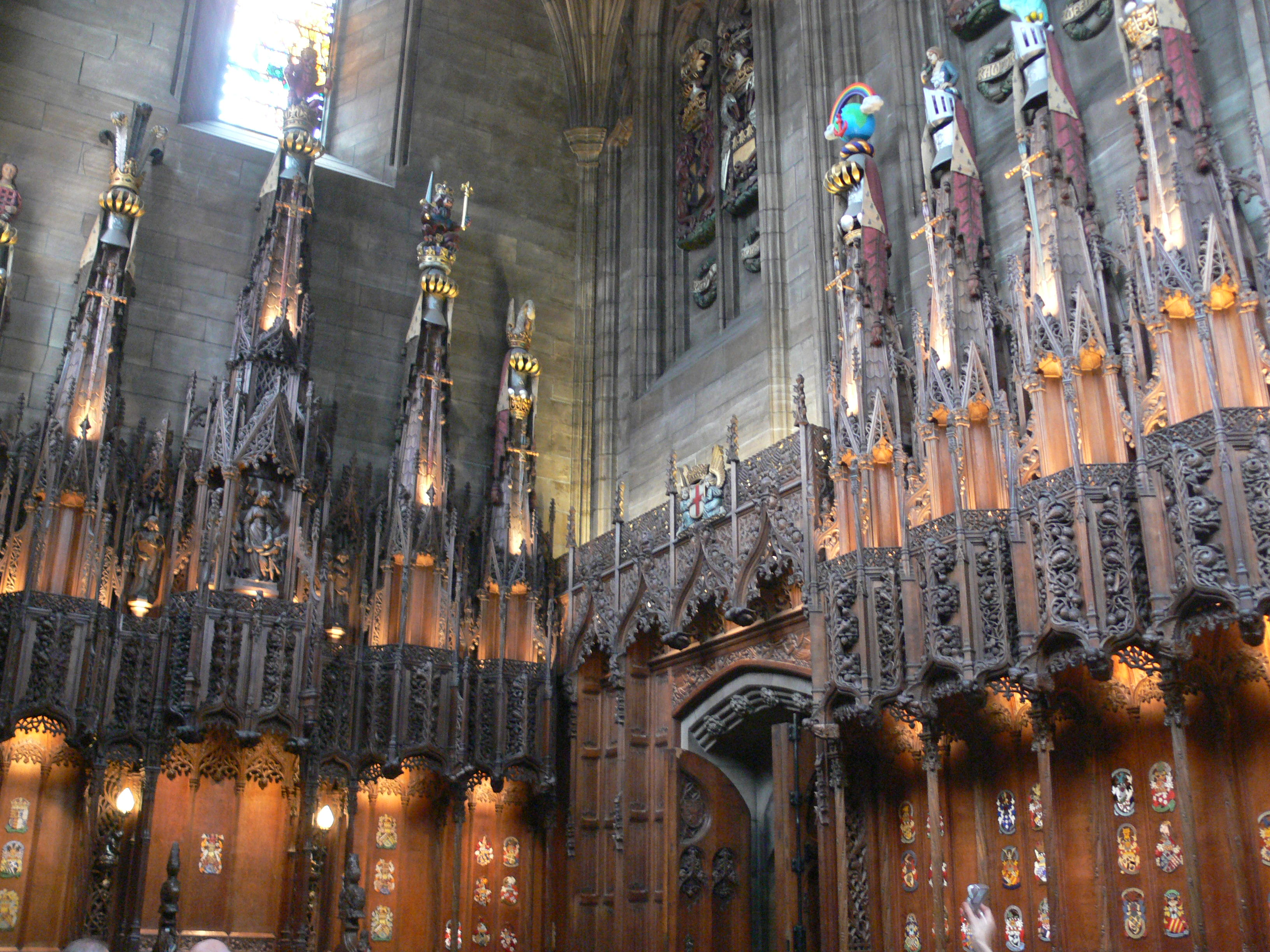
Thistle Chapel in St Giles' Cathedral

A promise of work for James Pittendrigh Macgillivray, an Edinburgh sculptor, who was then engaged on a large memorial work to Gladstone (now on Coates Crescent), took Deuchars to Edinburgh, but after a few weeks there was a disagreement and Deuchars found himself without work and he was replaced by William Shirreffs. Fortunately, the architect Robert Lorimer had just embarked on his commission for the new Chapel of the Knights of the Order of the Thistle at St Giles Cathedral. Deuchars's style of modelling appealed to Lorimer with the result that he made all the plaster models for the figure work, inside and outside, carved either in stone by Joseph Hayes & his men, in oak by the Clow brothers, or in bronze cast by the Bromsgrove Guild. This was the start of a profitable lengthy association with Lorimer, although he also continued to exhibit & sell work in various exhibitions. His last & largest work for Lorimer was the bronze group for the Glenelg War Memorial. After that his commissions from Lorimer declined, but, working independently, he did model a large Madonna & Child, a memorial to Miss McLaggan, in Old Saint Paul's, Edinburgh.

Louis Deuchars died on 19 September 1927 and was buried at Saughton Cemetery in south-west Edinburgh. His funeral was attended by all the major figures in the local art world.

== Sources ==
- Boreham, Louise "Louis Reid Deuchars (1870–1927) & the Relationship between Sculptors & Architects", PhD Thesis, Edinburgh College of Art, December 1998.
- Boreham, Louise "Aldourie Pottery, Dores, Inverness-shire" in "Scottish Pottery Historical Review No.9", 1984/5, pp. 37–39.
- Boreham, Louise "Aldourie: Testament of hope” in “The Scotsman – Weekend”, 11 July 1987.
- Boreham, Louise “Louis Reid Deuchars” in “The Architectural Heritage Society of Scotland – The Journal and Annual Report 1988 No 15, pp. 14–20.
- Boreham, Louise “In Grandfather’s Footsteps” in “Motorcaravan and Motorhome Monthly”, March 1988, pp. 34 & 36.
- Boreham, Louise "Louis Reid Deuchars – Collaboration with Sir Robert Lorimer", in "Church Monuments, Journal of the Church Monuments Society" Volume XII 1977, pp. 87–93.
- Boreham, Louise "Louis Reid Deuchars and the Aldourie Pottery" in "Journal of the Scottish Society for Art History" Volume 2 1997, pp. 1 – 9.
- Boreham, Louise "Sculptors v. Architects" in "Architectural Heritage IX, The Journal of the Architectural Heritage Society of Scotland", 1998, pp. 84–98.
- Boreham, Louise “A Fitting Tribute – The Story of the Glenelg War Memorial”, in “Wester Ross Life”, Issue 12, 1998, p14.
- Boreham, Louise "The Thistle Chapel : a reassessment of the windows and carving" in "Architectural Heritage X, The Journal of the Architectural Heritage Society of Scotland", 1999, pp. 54 – 65.
- Boreham, Louise “Compton Chapel" in "The Victorian, the Magazine of the Victorian Society", No. 3, March 2000, pp. 10 – 13.
- Boreham, Louise “Louis Reid Deuchars and the Altar at Mount Stuart” in “Sculpture Journal VII”, PMSA London, 2002, pp. 83 – 94.
- Boreham, Louise “Wood Carving in Dunblane Cathedral Choir” in “Journal of the Society of Friends of Dunblane Cathedral”, Vol. XIX, 2002, Part 1, pp. 4 – 10.
- Boreham, Louise “New Bosses for the Roof of Glasgow Cathedral Choir” in Architectural Heritage XV, The Journal of the Architectural Heritage Society of Scotland", 2004, pp. 117–128.
- Boreham, Louise “Louis Reid Deuchars at Limnerslease” in “Watts Magazine”, Issue 5 Winter 2009, pp. 21,2.
- Blair, Robin; Boreham, Louise; Burnett, Charles; Cumming, Elizabeth; Roads, Elizabeth "The Thistle Chapel", Edinburgh, 2009.
- Boreham, Louise "The Early Days of The Compton Pottery" in "Watts Magazine", Issue 9 Summer 2010, pp. 14–18.
- Boreham, Louise “Sculptors and Architects – two Scottish case studies”, in “Sculpture Journal”, Volume 21.2, 2012, pp. 157–167.
- Boreham, Louise “Notable Contributors to the Chapel Decoration” in Mary Watts, “The Word in the Pattern”, facsimile, Surrey 2012, pp. 97–103.
- Boreham, Louise “Victoria’s Diamond Jubilee”, in “Watts Magazine”, Issue 14 Spring 2012, p. 23.
- Boreham, Louise “From Cumnock to Compton”, in ‘Northern Ceramic Society Journal’, Volume 29, 2013, pp. 79–96, plus ‘From Cumnock to Compton – Update’ in ‘Northern Ceramic Society Newsletter’ no 170, June 2013, p. 21.
- Boreham, Louise “G. F. Watts’s della Robbia tondo”, in ‘Sculpture Journal’ Volume 22.1 [2013], pp. 133–139.
