= Watts Cemetery Chapel =

British Art Nouveau chapel in Surrey, England

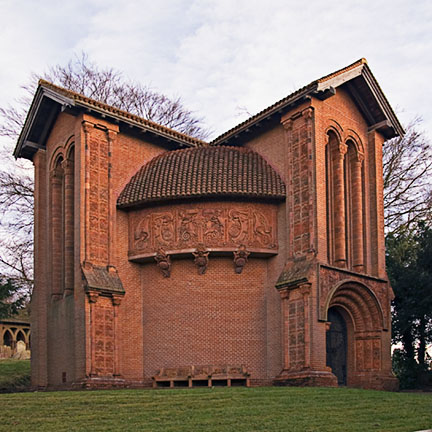

- Location in Surrey Location in England

General information
- Architectural style: Gothic Revival
- Location: Compton, Surrey, England
- Coordinates: 51°13′04″N 0°37′56″W
- Construction started: 1896
- Completed: 1898
- Client: Watts Gallery

Design and construction
- Architect: Mary Fraser-Tytler

Listed Building – Grade I
- Official name: Watts Memorial Chapel
- Designated: 14 June 1967
- Reference no.: 1029541

The Watts Cemetery Chapel or Watts Mortuary Chapel is a chapel in a Modern Style (British Art Nouveau style) version of Celtic Revival in the village cemetery of Compton in Surrey. The designer was Mary Fraser Tytler, an artist resident in the village, who married the painter and sculptor George Frederic Watts. While the overall architectural structure is loosely Romanesque Revival, the lavish decoration in terracotta relief carving and paintings is Celtic Revival, on an unusually large scale. According to the local council, it is "a unique concoction of art nouveau, Celtic, Romanesque and Egyptian influence with Mary's own original style".

Other responses have been less positive. Ian Nairn, in the 1971 Surrey volume of the Buildings of England series, described the interior as "one of the most soporific rooms in England" and regretted "the intolerable torpor and weariness of the motifs". It is a Grade I listed building.

== History ==
When Compton Parish Council created a new cemetery, local resident artist Mary Fraser Tytler, the wife of Victorian era painter and sculptor George Frederic Watts, offered to design and build a new mortuary chapel. The Wattses had recently built a house, "Limnerslease", a few hundred yards away, now part of the Watts Gallery. Tytler was a follower of the Home Arts and Industries Association, set up by Earl Brownlow in 1885 to encourage handicrafts among the lower classes, and the chapel was the Wattses' contribution to this characteristically Victorian preoccupation with social improvement through creative enlightenment.

A group of local amateurs and enthusiasts, many of whom later went on with Mary Fraser Tytler to found the Compton Potters' Arts Guild, constructed the chapel from 1896 to 1898; virtually every village resident was involved. The ground plan is essentially circular; from the outside the building has the look of a Roman Italianate chapel. Local villagers were invited to decorate the chapel under Mary's guidance, resulting in an interior that fuses art nouveau and Celtic influences, combined with Mary's own original style. Each member of Fraser Tytler's evening class, led by Louis Deuchars, had a separate job, with 74 Compton villagers taking part. G. F. Watts paid for the project and also painted a version of The All-Pervading for the altar only three months before he died.

The graves display sayings influenced by the Arts and Crafts movement, including "The Morning Stars Sang Together" and, inside the chapel, "Their hope is full of immortality but the souls of the righteous are in the hands of God."

Both Wattses have memorials in the "cloister" a few yards from the chapel, and a number of the memorials throughout the small cemetery use unglazed terracotta, even from dates after the Compton Pottery closed in the 1950s. Members of the Huxley family, including Julia Huxley and her sons Aldous Huxley and Julian Huxley are buried within the cemetery.

The chapel is open Monday to Friday: 8am – 5pm, Saturday to Sunday and bank holidays: 10am – 5:30pm and is managed by the nearby Watts Gallery, celebrating the architect and her husband. There is no charge.

== Gallery ==
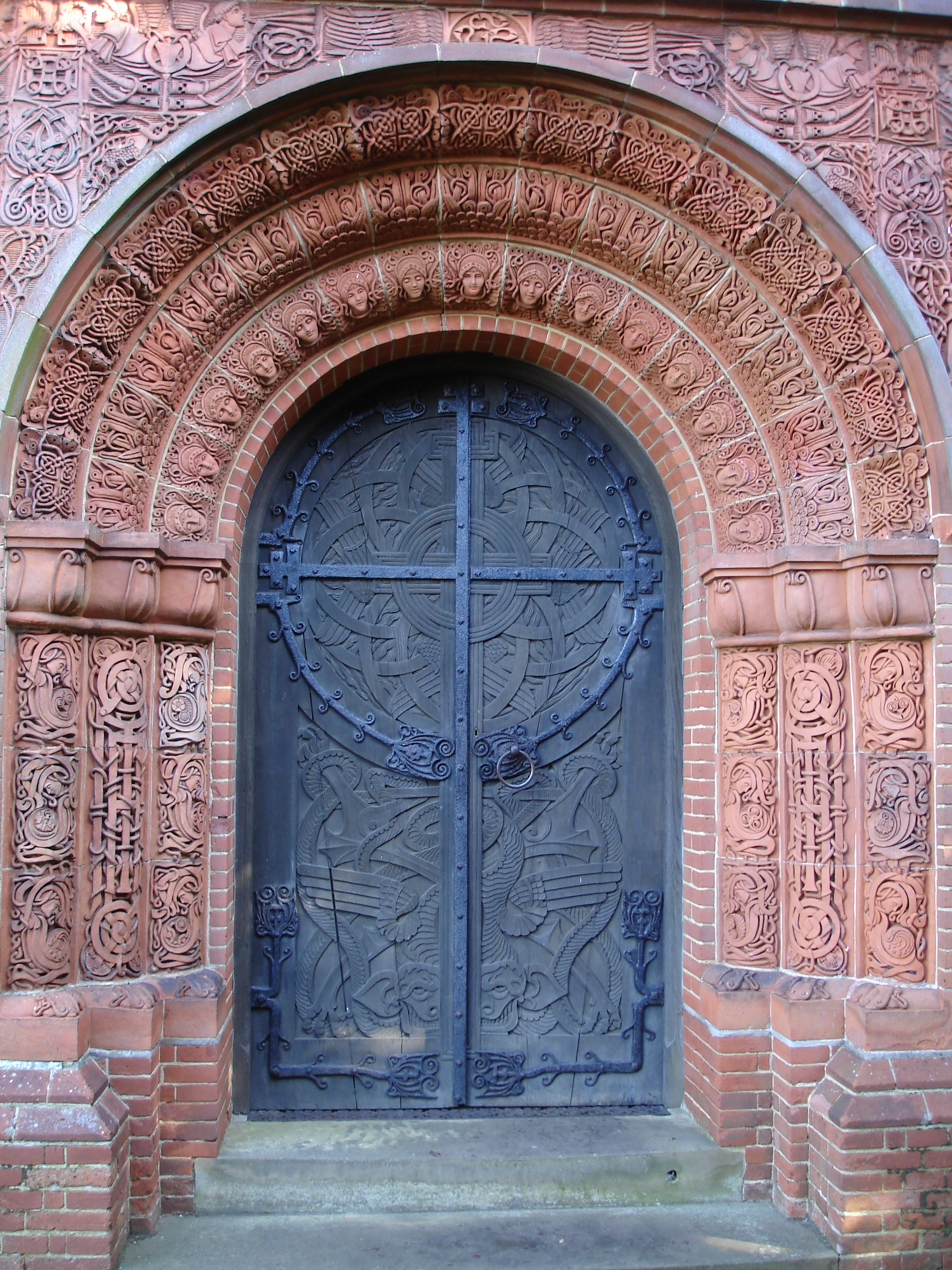
The doorway

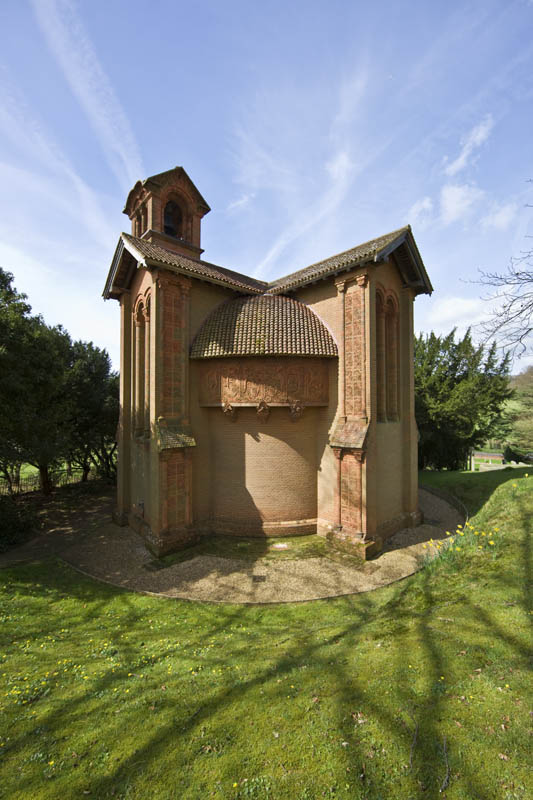
Chapel view showing campanile

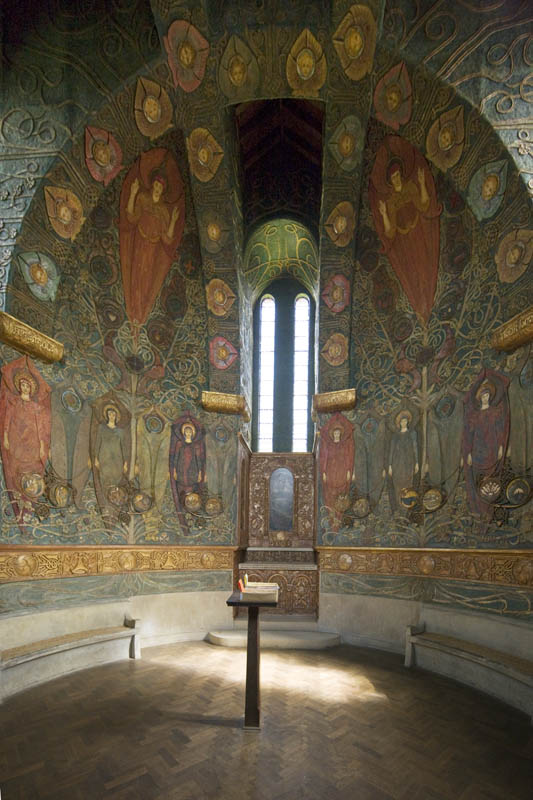
Chapel and altar

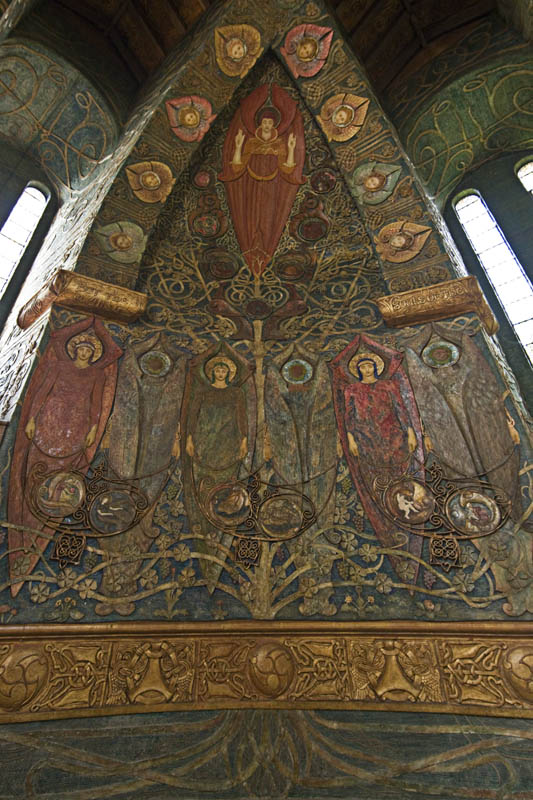
Tree of life

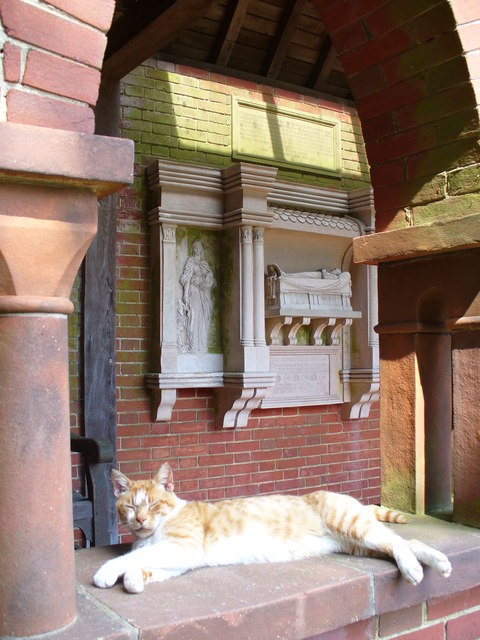
Monument to the Wattses
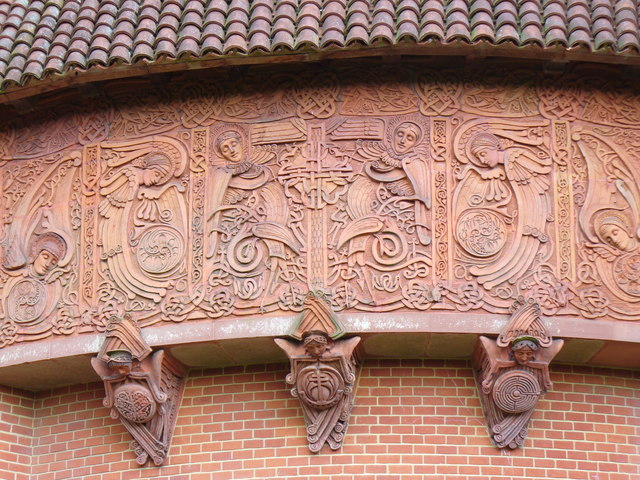
Detail of the exterior reliefs

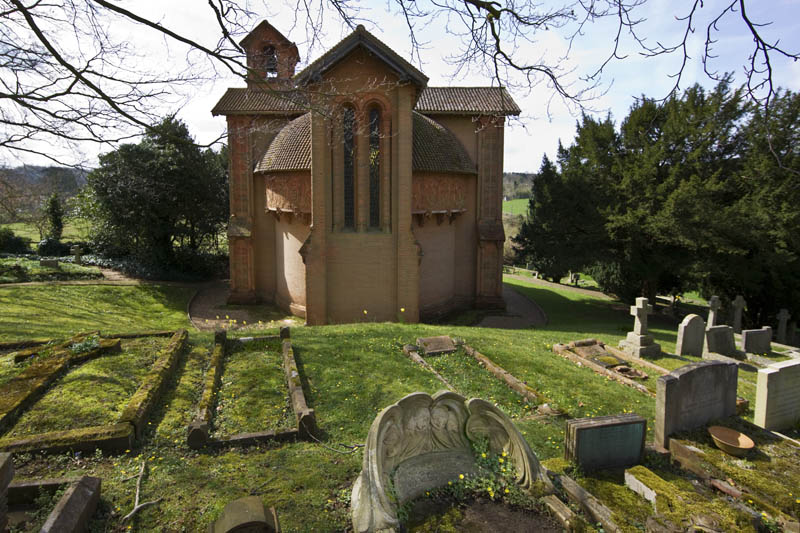
Chapel, showing in foreground terracotta grave marker made in the Compton pottery

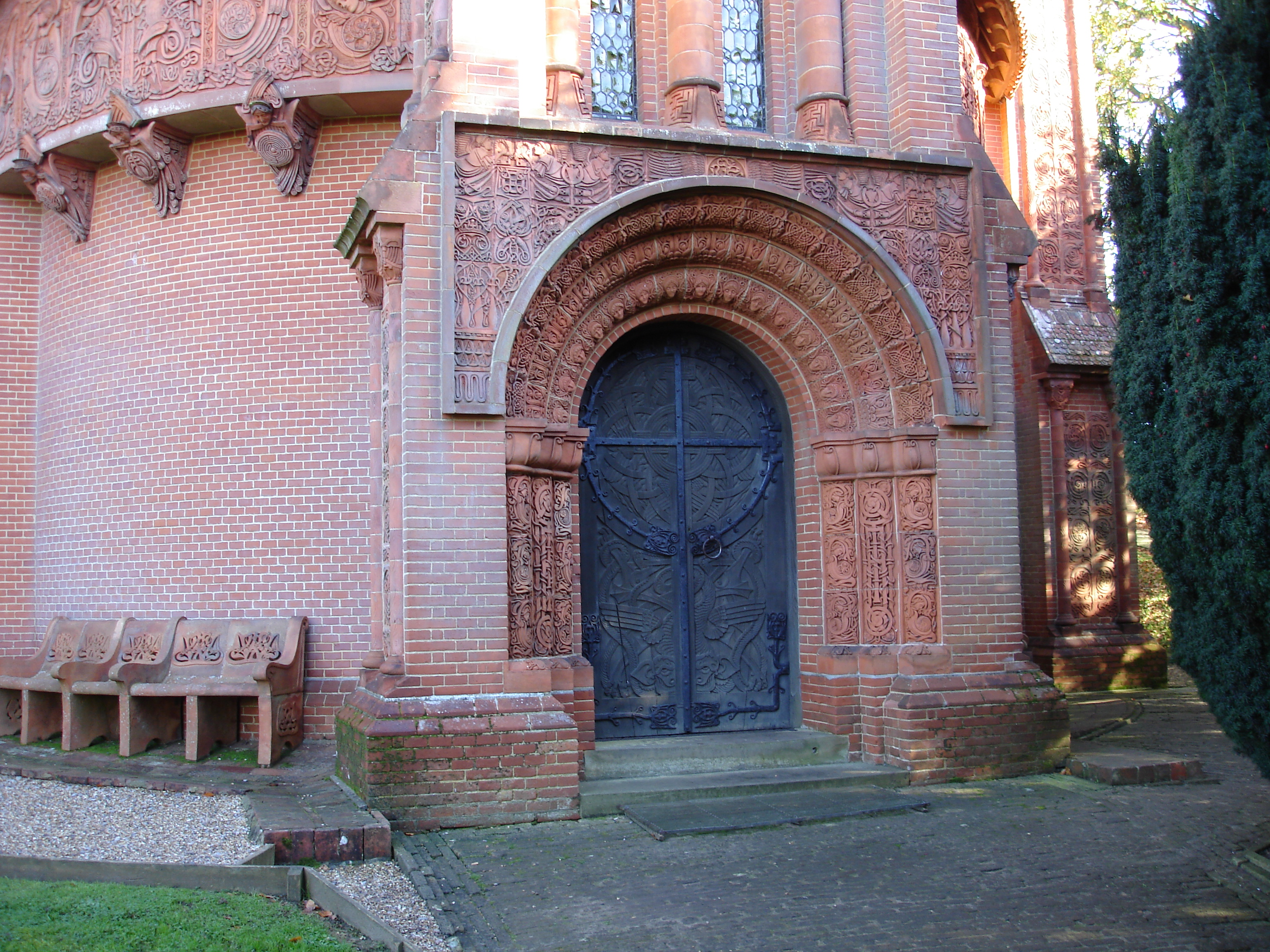
Watts mortuary chapel

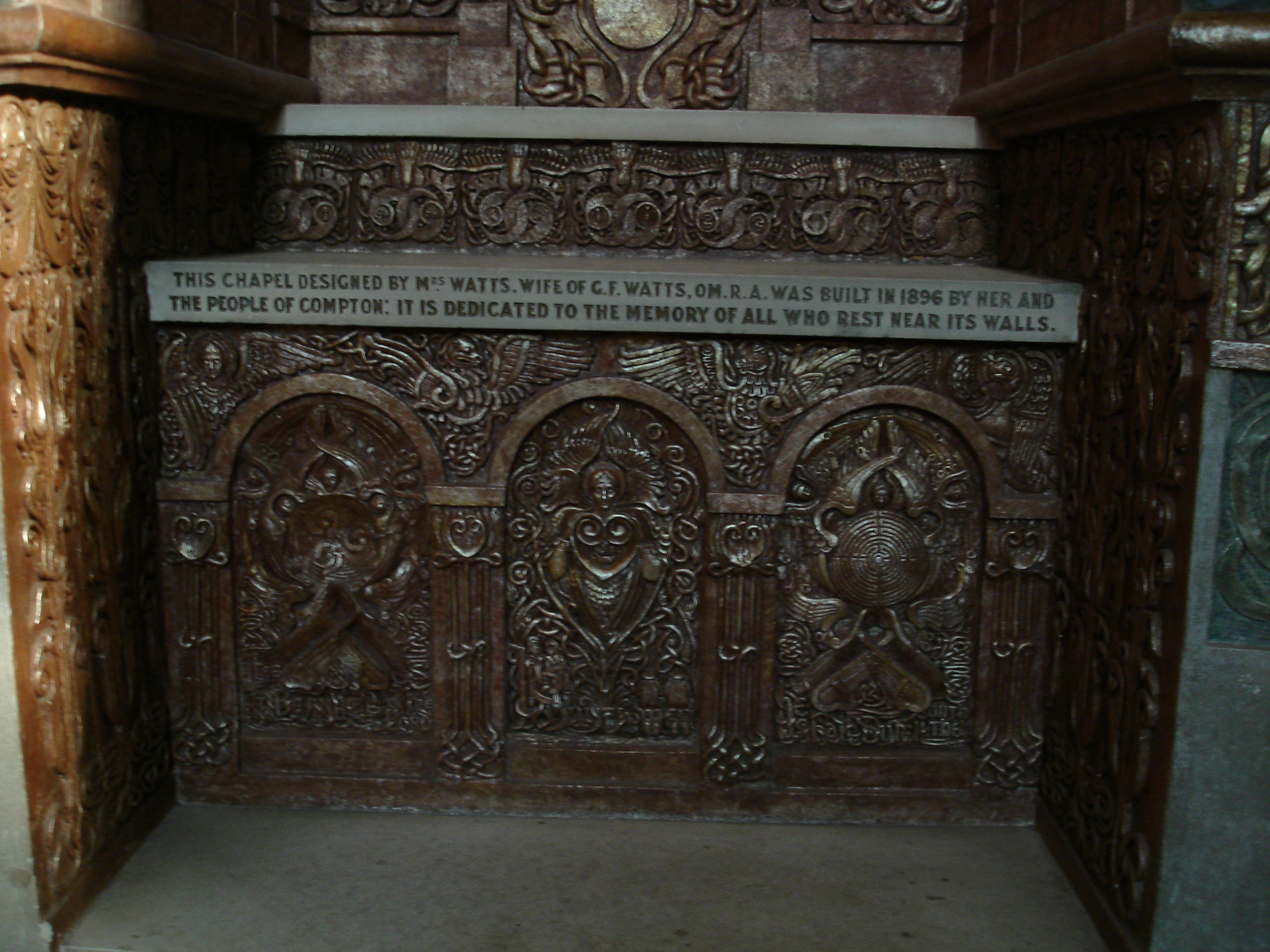
The altar

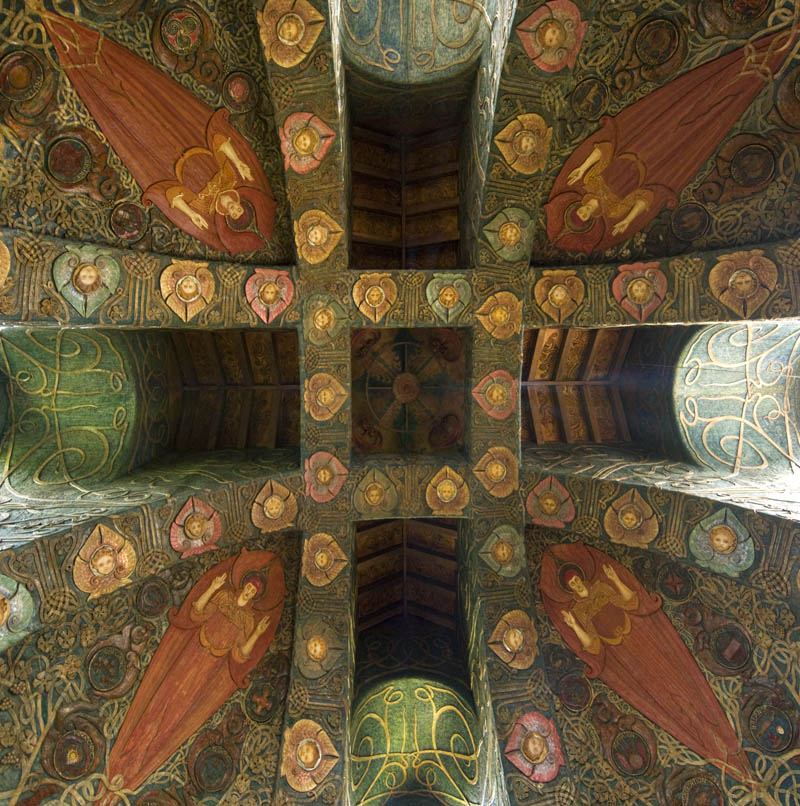
Chapel ceiling apex showing the 4 seraphs

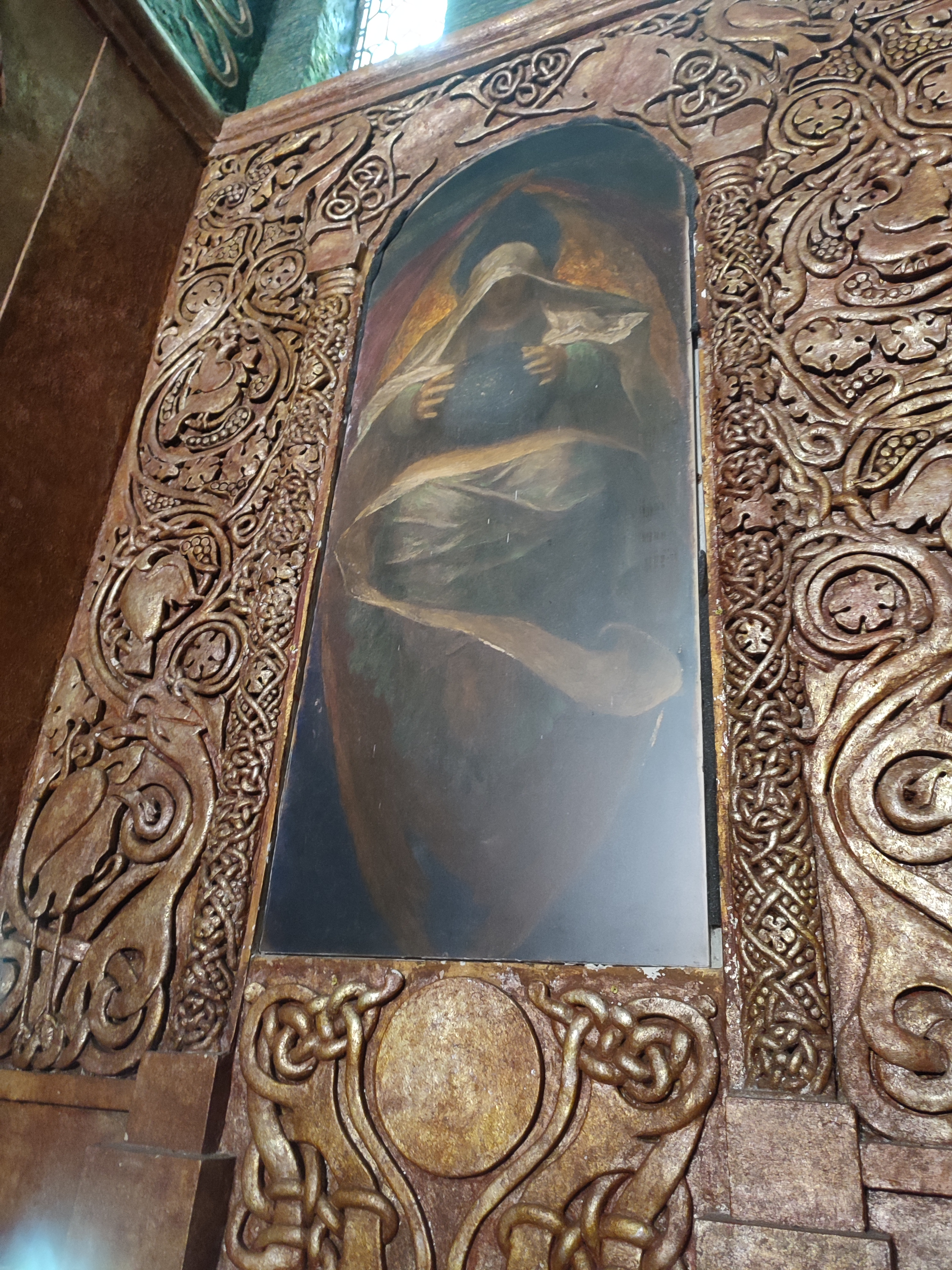
George Watts' rendition of The All-Pervading for the reredos

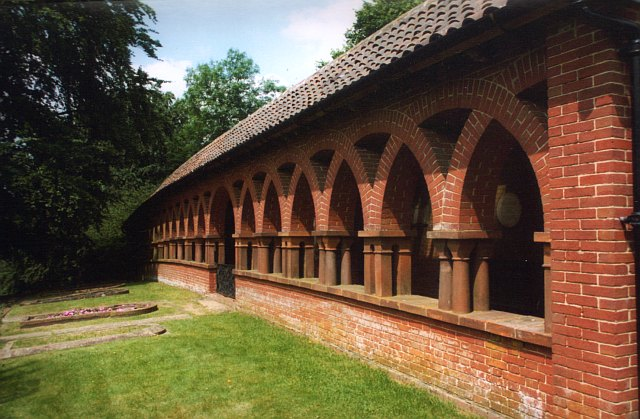
The Cloister near the chapel

== Sources ==
- Nairn, Ian; Pevsner, Nikolaus; Cherry, Bridget (1971). Surrey. The Buildings of England. Harmondsworth, Middlesex, England: Penguin Books. ISBN 0300096755.
