= Filler (media) =

Content inserted to pad out transmission gaps

Filler is material of lower cost or quality that is used to fill a certain television or radio time slot or physical medium, such as a music album.

== Broadcasting ==
During the Golden Age of Radio, when a scheduled program was unavailable or delayed or when a program ran overtime or undertime leaving space to fill until the next scheduled program. Radio stations would have musicians (and orchestras or bands in the case of networks and larger stations) on hand to perform live musical interludes. The long-running show Make Believe Ballroom began as a way to fill up time with recorded music to fill up gaps during WNEW's coverage of the Lindbergh kidnapping trial in 1935.

In the early days of television, most output was live. The hours of broadcast were limited, and so a test card was commonly broadcast at other times. When a breakdown happened during a live broadcast, a standard recording filled in. On the BBC, a film of a potter's wheel was often used for this purpose, filmed at the Compton Potters' Arts Guild. Similar short films, such as a kitten playing, were also used as interludes or interstitial programs to fill gaps in TV schedules. In the United States, these have their roots in the old Saturday afternoon horror movies hosted on independent stations. The fishcam is a particularly widespread form of filler in this tradition.

Anime series sometimes need to include filler arcs, as televised anime episodes are generally published at a higher rate than the manga chapters from which many anime draw their source material. Notable anime to feature large amounts of filler include Naruto and Bleach.

Television stations also broadcast filler in the form of music video clips, either from record labels or performance recordings from the studio of one of the television stations, to fill in the empty minutes leading up to the actual program time, approximately 2-5 minutes beforehand.

Sometimes, filler content can exceed the expectations of the producers. For instance, the characters Bob and Doug McKenzie were created solely as filler in improvised segments called "The Great White North" for the television comedy show Second City Television to satisfy CBC Television's request for two minutes of identifiable Canadian content in each episode. However, these segments quickly became the most popular part of the series.

== Music albums ==
Albums of music were typically of a set size determined by the physical medium such as the vinyl record (typically 22 minutes per side) or CD (maximum 80 minutes). It was normal, especially in the 1960s, for artists to attempt to "pad out" their material to the standard length by including filler tracks of lesser quality.

Often, songs written by the artists or the producer of an album were included as filler or released on the B-side of singles to generate more royalties for the songwriter or artist.

Cover versions are often considered to be fillers, though this judgement varies with the amount of creative interpretation and adaption of the original. Similarly, live recordings, demo versions or remixes follow the same argument.

On the subject of music downloads, Courtney Love told the Digital Hollywood conference "If you're afraid of your own filler then I bet you're afraid of Napster", meaning that other artists may be afraid of listeners being able to listen to a full album before buying it.

== See also ==
- Bus plunge
- Evergreen content
- Screen saver
- Slow television
- Silly season, the time of the year when the news is full of filler content
