= The All-Pervading =

Painting by George Frederic Watts

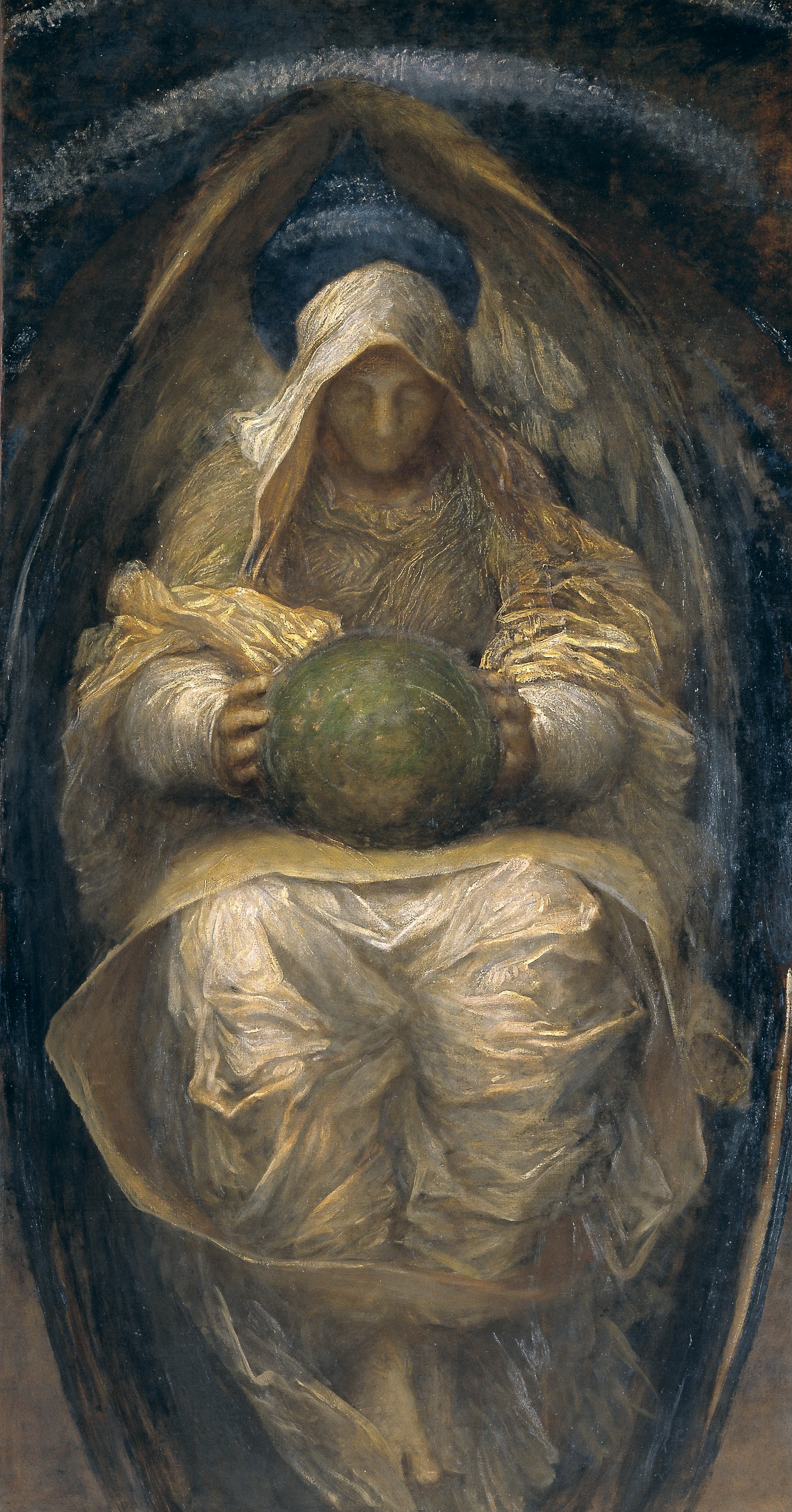
- Artist: George Frederic Watts
- Year: 1887-1890
- Medium: Oil on canvas
- Dimensions: 213.5 cm × 112 cm (84.1 in × 44 in)
- Location: Watts Gallery; Compton
- Owner: Tate Britain

The All-Pervading is an allegorical painting produced between 1887 and 1890 by the English artist George Frederic Watts. Influenced by the Sibyls of the Sistine Chapel ceiling, it symbolises the spirit Watts saw as governing "the immeasurable expanse". He presented it to the Tate Gallery in 1899 and it is now on loan from Tate Britain to the Watts Gallery in Compton, Guildford. He also produced a variant on it as the altarpiece for the Watts Mortuary Chapel.
