= St Nicholas' Church, Compton =

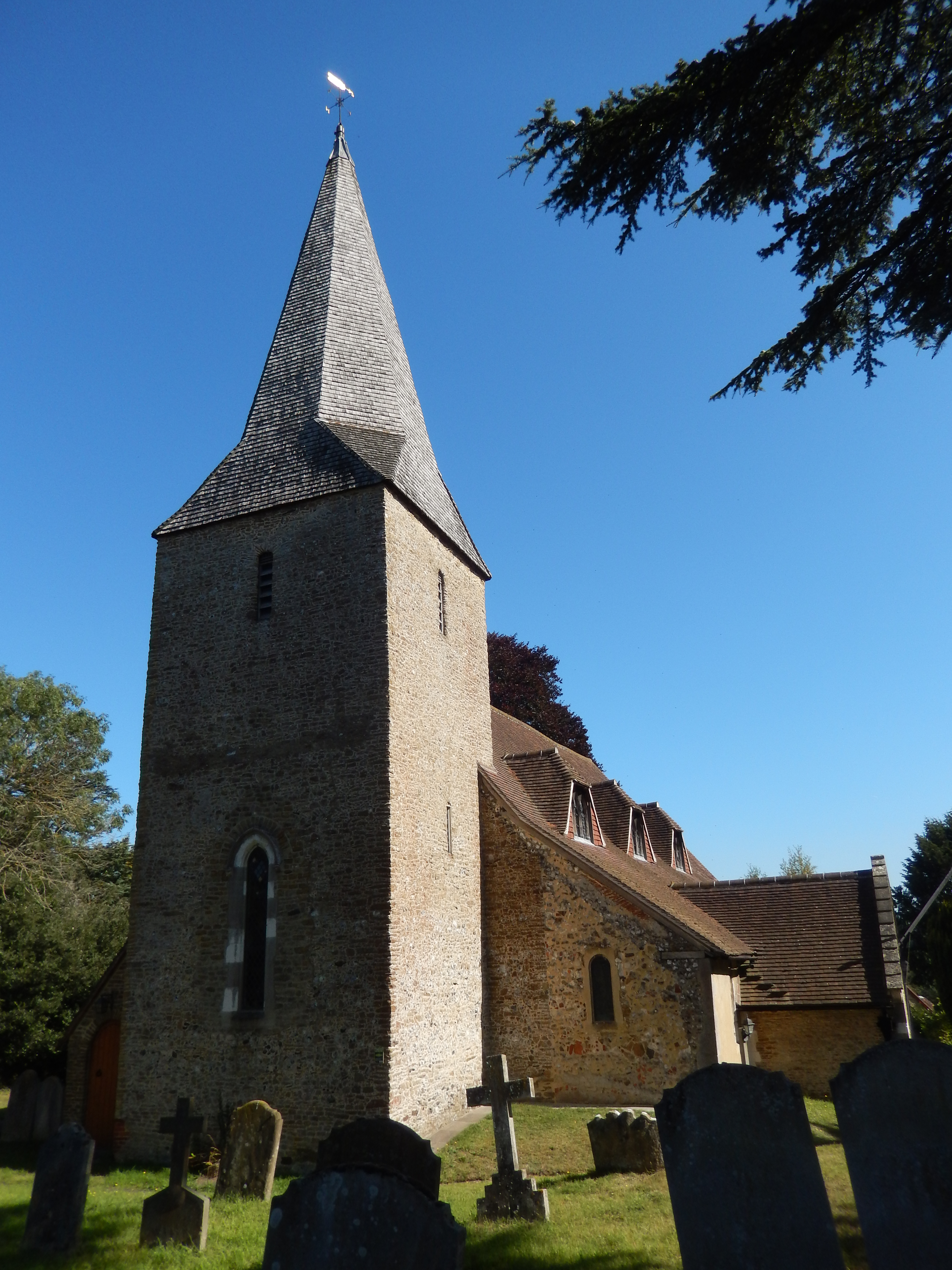
- St Nicholas' Church, Compton
- 51.2144°N 0.6349°W
- Country: England
- Denomination: Church of England

History
- Dedication: Saint Nicholas

Administration
- Province: Canterbury
- Diocese: Guildford
- Parish: Compton

Listed Building – Grade I
- Official name: Church of St Nicholas
- Designated: 14 June 1967
- Reference no.: 1188621

St Nicholas’ Church, Compton is the parish church of the Church of England parish of Compton, near Guildford in Surrey, England. It is a Grade I listed building and is regarded as one of the most architecturally significant medieval churches in the county, notable for its rare two-storey sanctuary and substantial pre-Conquest fabric.

== History ==
=== Early origins ===
The church stands on a sandy spur overlooking the village and valley below. According to the Victoria County History, the west tower is of rough construction, built entirely of ragstone rubble without ashlar dressings, and its form and narrow round-headed openings strongly suggest a date prior to the Norman Conquest. Early masonry of similar character survives in the quoins of the nave.

The shell of the chancel walls is thought to be of late 11th-century origin, although later altered and heightened. The church is recorded in the Domesday Survey of Compton in 1086, confirming its existence by the late Anglo-Saxon period.

=== 12th-century enlargement ===
During the 12th century the church underwent major enlargement and reordering. Around 1160 the nave arcades, north and south aisles, and chancel arch were constructed in hard chalk, and a larger tower arch replaced an earlier opening. The nave is notable for narrowing slightly towards the east, a feature possibly reflecting phased construction.

About 1180 the eastern part of the chancel was remodelled to form a highly unusual two-storey sanctuary. The older walls were thickened internally to provide additional support for vaulting, creating a vaulted lower sanctuary with an upper chapel above—an arrangement described by the Victoria County History as extremely rare in English parish churches.

=== Later medieval and post-medieval changes ===
In the 14th and 15th centuries the south aisle was heightened and several windows were altered or replaced. Medieval tomb recesses were inserted in the north aisle, and fittings such as squints and piscinae were added or modified to reflect evolving liturgical practice.

The church was restored in 1843 under the architect Henry Woodyer, with further works undertaken in 1869 and 1906. These interventions brought the fabric into a good state of repair but also altered some external features.

== Architecture ==
St Nicholas’ Church is built primarily of Bargate stone rubble with flint and chalk, with Bath stone used in later restoration. Much of the exterior is rendered. The roofs are tiled, and the timber spire of the west tower is shingled. Internally, most architectural dressings are of clunch or hard chalk.

The west tower is unbuttressed and lacks a staircase. Its construction and appearance are considered indicative of pre-Conquest work. The nave arcades comprise three bays on each side, with slightly pointed arches and capitals carved with scallop, volute, and foliage ornament, particularly rich on the south side.

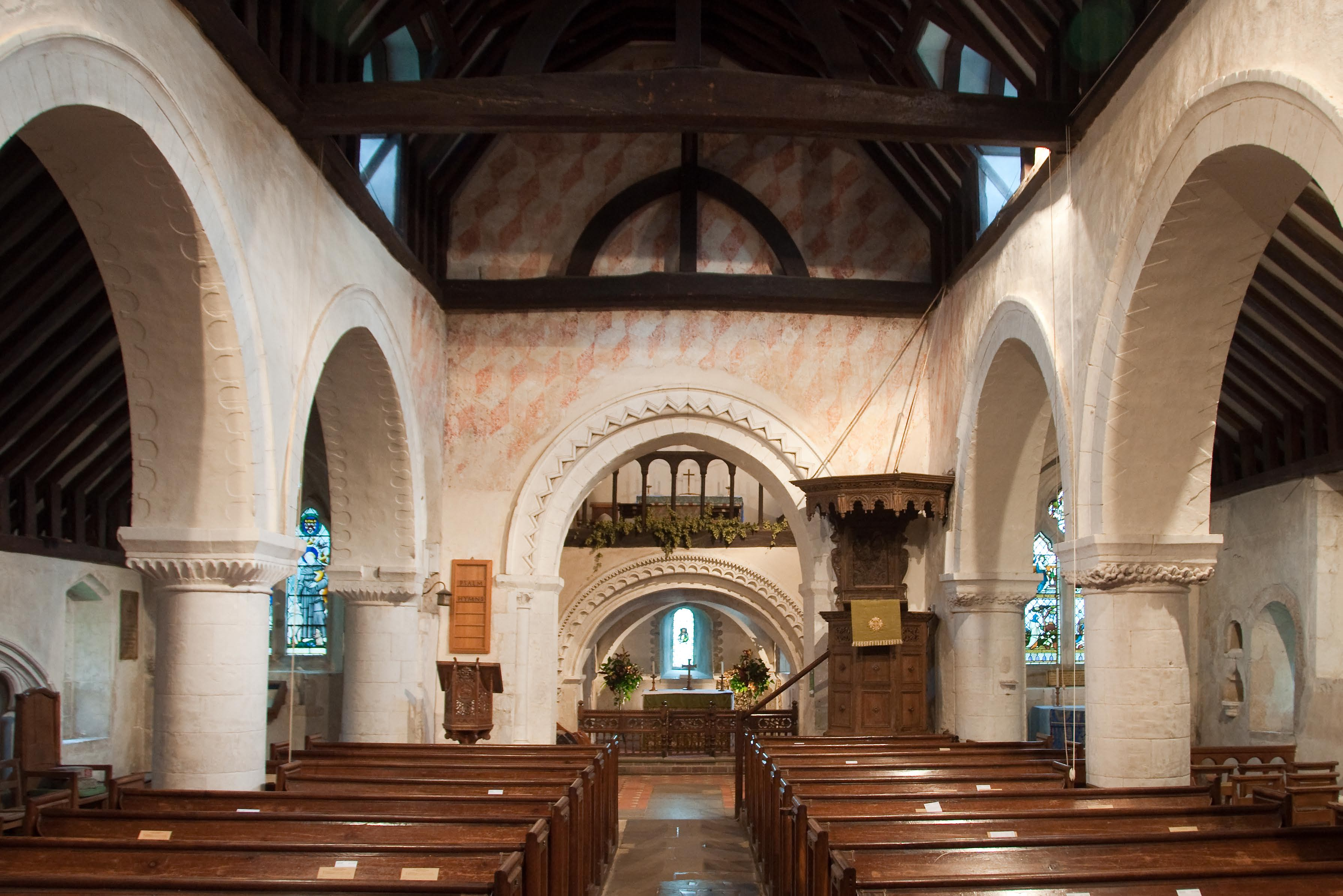
The church interior looking east, showing the wall-paintings and two-storey chancel

=== Two-storey sanctuary and anchorite cell ===
The most distinctive feature of the church is its two-storey sanctuary, formed about 1180. The lower sanctuary is vaulted with low-pitched segmental ribs, while above it an upper chapel opens into the chancel through a unique wooden balustrade consisting of nine semi-circular arches cut from a single plank. This screen is one of the earliest surviving examples of church woodwork in England.

On the south side of the chancel is a small projecting chamber, variously interpreted as an anchorite’s cell or a watching-place. It contains a squint commanding a view of the altar and shows physical wear consistent with prolonged devotional use. Burials discovered beneath a nearby tomb have been suggested as the remains of successive anchorites associated with the cell.

== Fittings and furnishings ==
The church retains a late 12th-century font of unusual design, medieval tomb recesses, and fragments of trompe-l'oeil wall painting. Particularly notable are the early 17th-century fittings, including the communion table, rails, pulpit, sounding board, and chancel screen, all richly carved with pierced scrollwork.

=== Stained glass ===
A fragment of early 13th-century stained glass depicting the Virgin Mary and Child survives in the sanctuary. Other surviving glass dates from the 17th or 18th centuries and includes a depiction of the Baptism of Christ.

=== Monuments ===
Among the monuments is a brass dated 1508 commemorating Thomas Jennings and his wife Margaret, with figures of their children. The church also contains later memorials of the 17th and 18th centuries, including inscriptions to members of the Fulham family and other local gentry.

== Parish and worship ==
St Nicholas’ remains an active parish church within the Diocese of Guildford. Regular services are held, and the church is open daily to visitors. The current Rector is Rev Sally Buddle.

== Heritage designation ==
The church is listed at Grade I on the National Heritage List for England (List Entry Number 1188621), first listed on 14 June 1967.
