= Compton, Guildford =

Village and civil parish in Surrey, England

Coordinates: 51°12′50″N 0°37′57″W

Compton
- Village and civil parish
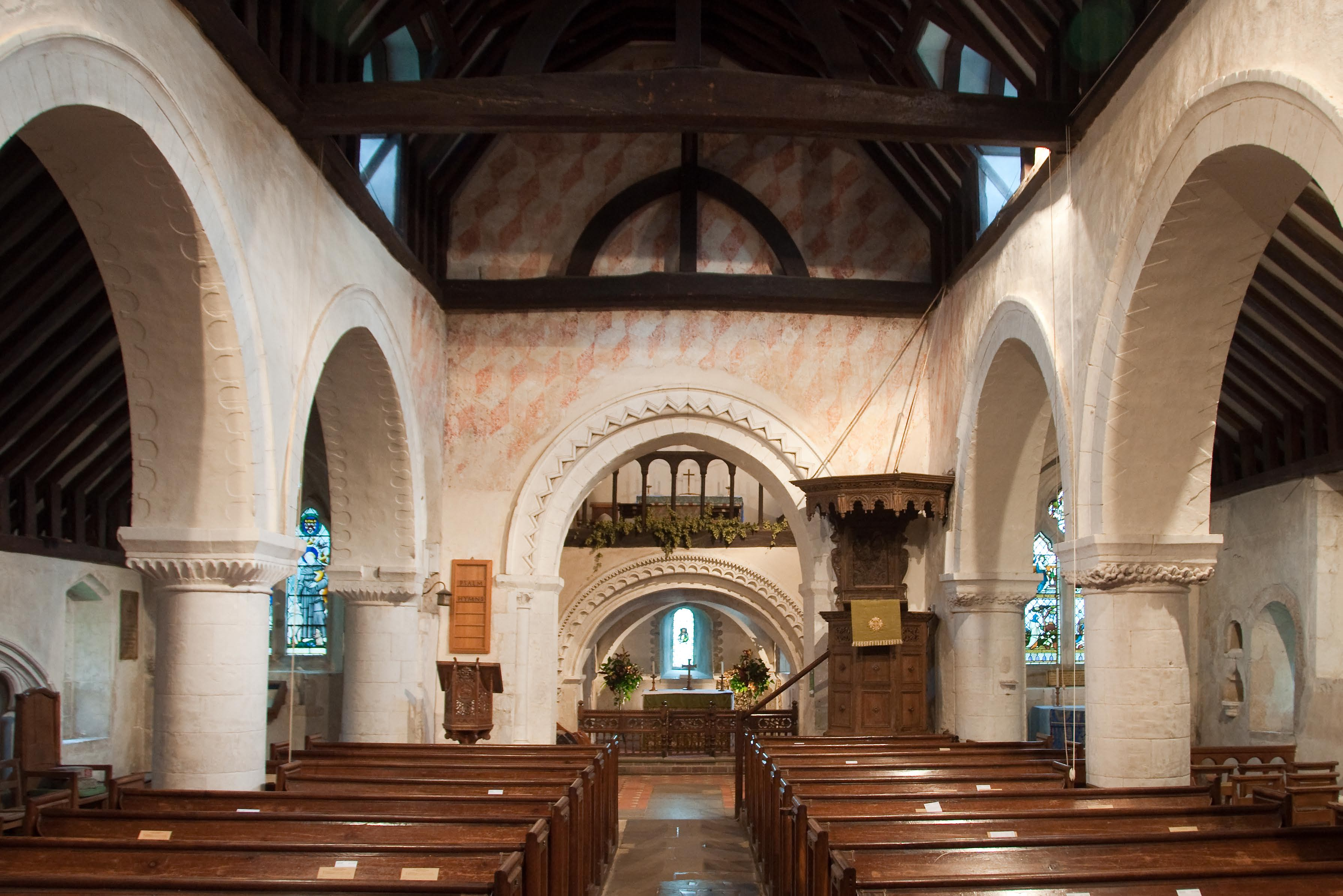
- St Nicholas' Church, Compton.

- Location within Surrey
- Area: 8.43 km^{2} (3.25 sq mi)
- Population: 1,154 (Civil Parish 2011)
  - Density: 137/km^{2} (350/sq mi)
- OS grid reference: SU9546
- Civil parish: Compton
- District: Guildford
- Shire county: Surrey
- Region: South East
- Country: England
- Sovereign state: United Kingdom
- Post town: Guildford
- Postcode district: GU3
- Dialling code: 01483
- Police: Surrey
- Fire: Surrey
- Ambulance: South East Coast
- UK Parliament: Godalming and Ash

Compton is a village and civil parish in the Guildford district of Surrey, England. It is about 3 miles WSW of the centre of Guildford. It has a medieval church (St Nicholas') and a close connection with fine art and pottery: it was the later life home of artist George Frederic Watts. The parish has considerable woodland and agricultural land, and the undeveloped portions are in the Metropolitan Green Belt. The village is traversed by the North Downs Way and has a large western conservation area. Central to the village are the Watts Gallery and the cemetery chapel commissioned for George Watts by his wife, two inns and the parish church.

== Geography ==
The village is just off the Compton junction of the A3 road, and the North Downs Way passes to the north of the village. Compton contains the Watts Mortuary Chapel, built to the memory of Symbolist painter George Frederic Watts, a resident of the village. Development can be classed as ribbon development around the through road. The 2001 census gives a population of 972 living in 384 households. The maximum elevation of the parish is on the Hog's Back at 152 m (499 ft), the minimum at a small brook flowing east of the village centre, at its lowest on outflow at 45 m (148 ft) above sea level.

The western part of the village forms a conservation area (as well as a very small eastern part between The Avenue and Compton Wood).

== History ==
Relics from the structure of the tower of the village's church, St Nicholas', suggest that the area was settled during the period of Roman occupation of Britain. Compton appears in Domesday Book of 1086 as Conton(e). It was held by Walter, son of Othere. Its domesday assets were: 11 hides; 1 church, 9 ploughs, 7 acres (28,000 m^{2}) of meadow. It rendered £9.

St Nicholas' Church contains one of the oldest surviving carved Norman screens. The basic structure, including the tower, is Anglo-Saxon, but it has been much altered over the centuries. For example, the influence of the Normans can be seen in the arches, the timber roofing (thought to date back to 1165) and the unique carved wooden screen in the chancel. Other features were added in the generations that followed, such as the spire (14th century), the pulpit and the clock (17th century). A unique feature is the only surviving two-storey sanctuary in England. The church is grade I-listed.

On the outskirts of Compton is the 16th century stately home Loseley Park. The Great Hall contains panelling taken from Henry VIII's palace at Nonsuch Park.

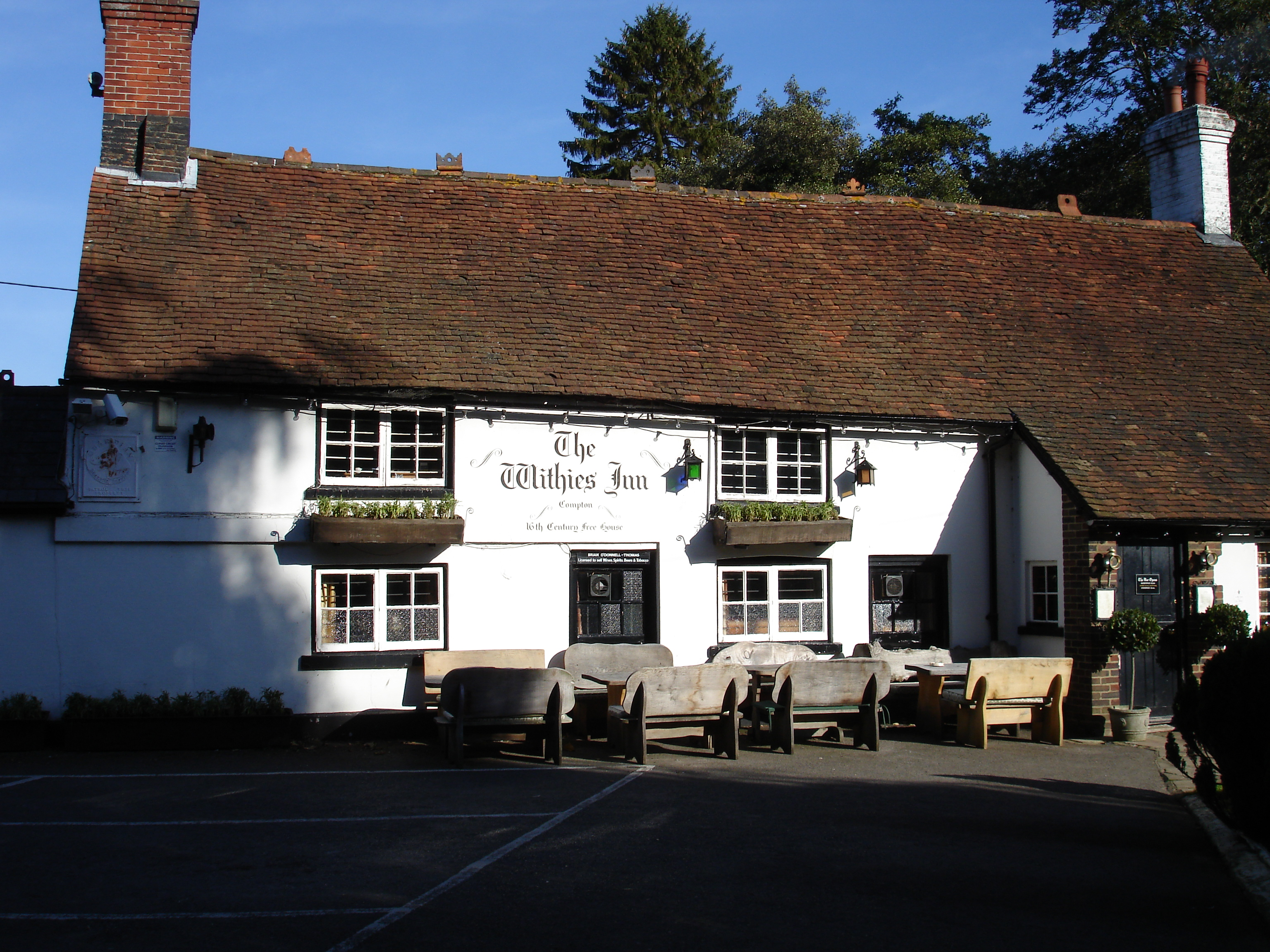
The Withies Inn

The Withies Inn is one of the oldest buildings in the village. Just off the main road, it was built in the 16th century.

The manor of Field Place was bought in 1709 by the London publisher Samuel Manship (1665-1720), passing to his widow Anne and then their son John. His son John only had one child Anne, who eloped, and the manor was sold.

The ashes of Aldous Huxley were brought from the US on 27 October 1971 and interred in his parents' grave at Watts Cemetery.

== George Frederic Watts ==
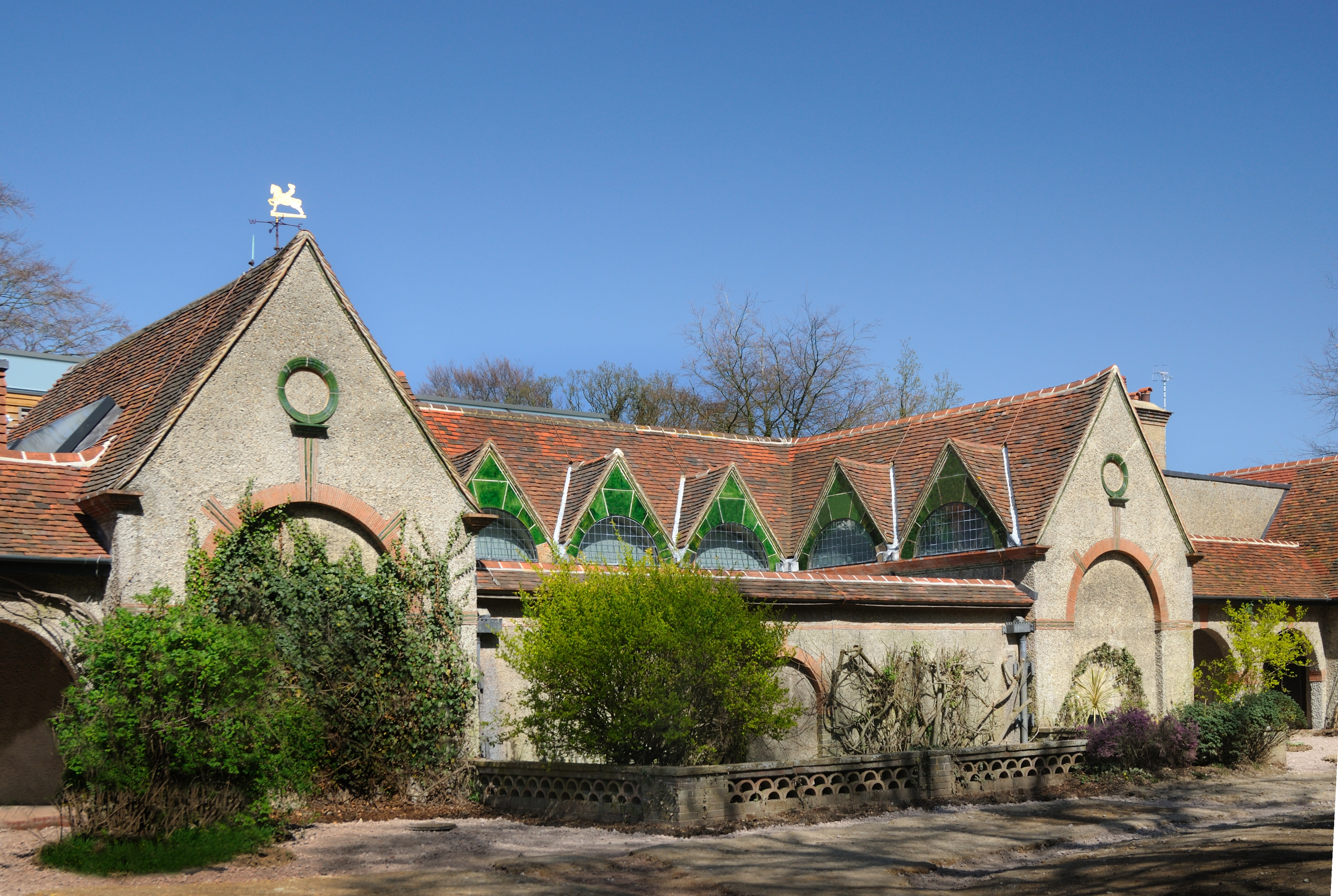
The Watts Gallery, Compton

One of Compton's most notable residents was the artist who was the painter and sculptor, George Frederic Watts, who lived his later life at a house in the village he called "Limnerslease", close to which is the early 20th century Watts Gallery, dedicated to his work. The gallery is open to visitors. After his death, the Watts Mortuary Chapel and cloister, designed by his wife, Mary Seton Watts, were built on a hill overlooking the village. Among his subjects were Hope (part of his "House of Life" cycle), Orpheus and Eurydice and a portrait of fellow artist, Dante Gabriel Rossetti.

== Potteries ==
The Compton Potters' Arts Guild was formed in 1899 by Mary Fraser-Tytler (her name before marriage to G. F. Watts) and initially used a source of local clay discovered during the building of Limnerslease. It continued until 1954.

Artist and historian Mary Wondrausch lived and worked in the parish at the site of a former brickworks. Made of local clay from the foundations of her pottery, sculptor Jon Edgar's Compton Triptych was unveiled in November 2011. The three terracotta heads celebrate the parish of Compton and the diverse figures who have contributed to this community.

== Literature ==
Arthur Conan Doyle's novels Sir Nigel and The White Company refer to certain characters as being buried in Compton Church.

Compton is the home village of characters described in Freeman Wills Crofts' 1933 murder mystery The Hog's Back Mystery.

== Demography and housing ==
The proportion of households in Compton who owned their home outright was 8% above the regional average. The proportion who owned their home with a loan was 3.6% lower than the regional average; social housing formed 13.7% of homes, providing overall a greater proportion of social rented housing and lower proportion of privately rented housing relative to the average of Surrey, the district and of the United Kingdom.

2011 Census Key Statistics
Output area	Population	Households	% Owned outright	% Owned with a loan	% Socially rented	hectares
Compton (CP)	1,154	386	40.4	31.9	13.7	843

2011 Census Homes
Output area	Detached	Semi-detached	Terraced	Flats and apartments	Caravans/temporary/ mobile homes	Shared between households
(Civil Parish)	173	113	51	49	0	0

The average level of accommodation in the region composed of detached houses was 28%, the average that was apartments was 22.6%.

== Politics ==
Compton is in Guildford (UK Parliament constituency), which since its inception has fluctuated between political parties. Local government is administered by Guildford Borough Council and Surrey County Council.

At Surrey County Council, one of the 81 representatives represents the area within the Shalford division.

At Guildford Borough Council small wards of the borough are each represented by two councillors.

Guildford Borough Councillors
Election	Member	Ward
2023	Catherine Houston	Shalford
2023	Dominique Williams	Shalford

Surrey County Councillor
Election	Member	Electoral Division
2017	Matt Furniss	Shalford

== See also ==
- List of places of worship in Guildford (borough)

== Sources ==
- Forster, David. (2001). AA 50 Walks in Surrey.
