= Mary Fraser Tytler =

British artist (1849–1938)

Mary Seton Watts
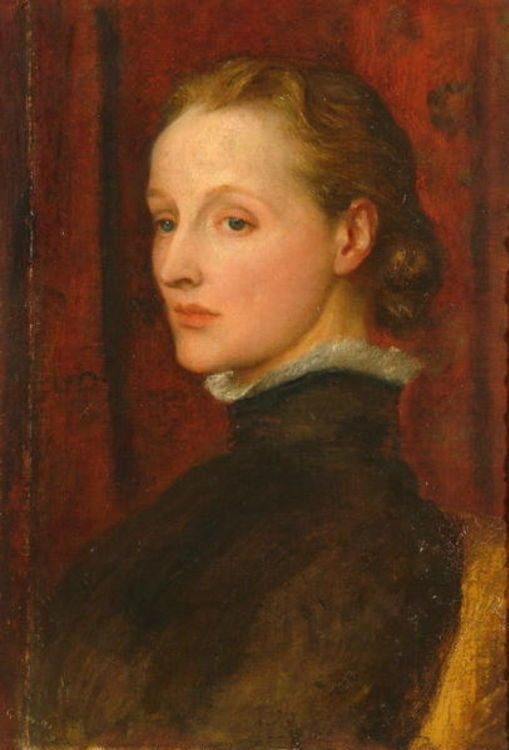
- Mary Fraser Tytler painted by G. F. Watts
- Born: Mary Seton Fraser Tytler; 25 November 1849; India
- Died: 6 September 1938 (aged 88); Compton, Surrey, England
- Education: South Kensington School of Art; Slade School of Art
- Known for: Painting, Ceramics
- Movement: Gothic Revival; Art Nouveau
- Spouse: George Frederic Watts (m. 1886; died 1904)

Mary Seton Fraser Tytler (married name Mary Seton Watts) (25 November 1849 – 6 September 1938) was a British symbolist craftswoman, designer and social reformer.

== Biography ==
Watts, née Fraser Tytler, was born on 25 November 1849, in India. She was the daughter of Charles Edward Fraser Tytler of Balnain and Aldourie, who worked for the East India Company. She spent much of her youth in Scotland, where she was raised by her grandparents, and settled in England in the 1860s. Early in 1870 she studied art in Dresden before enrolling at the South Kensington School of Art later the same year. During 1872 and 1873 Fraser Tytler studied sculpture at the Slade School of Art. She initially became known as a portrait painter, and was associated with Julia Margaret Cameron and the Freshwater community. There she met painter George Frederic Watts, and at the age of 36 (he was 69), became his second wife on 20 November 1886 in Epsom, Surrey.

Watts was president of the Godalming and District National Union of Women's Suffrage Society (a local branch of the National Union of Women's Suffrage Societies), and she convened at least one women's suffrage meeting in Compton, Surrey.

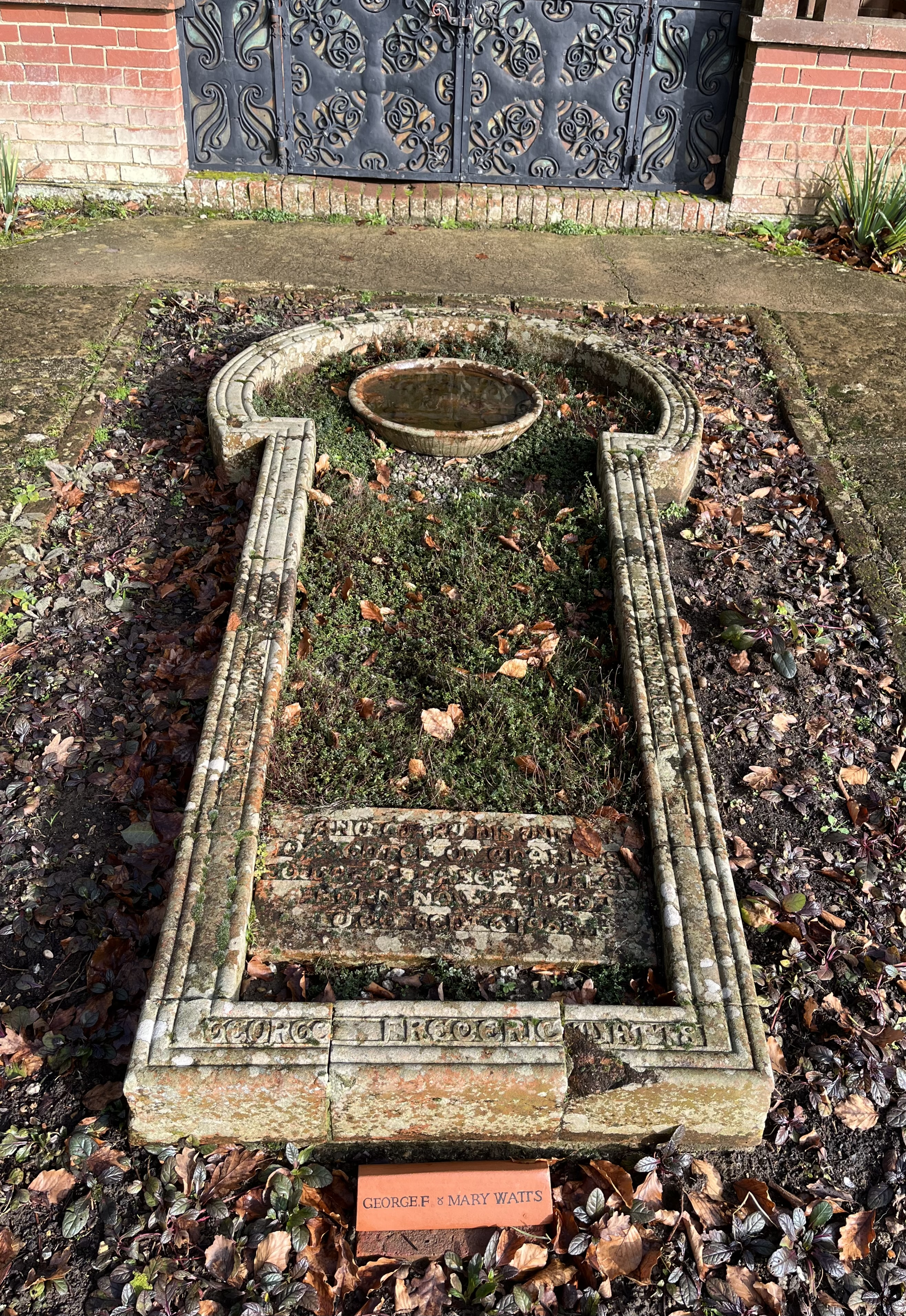
The grave of Mary Watts at the Watts Cemetery Chapel in 2026

Watts died at her home, Limnerslease, in Compton on 6 September 1938. Her remains are buried in the cemetery at the Watts Cemetery Chapel.

== Work ==
After her marriage, Watts largely worked in the fields of Celtic and Modern Style (British Art Nouveau style) bas-reliefs, pottery, metalwork, and textiles. She co-founded the Compton Potters' Arts Guild and the Arts & Crafts Guild in Compton, Surrey. She designed, built, and maintained the Watts Mortuary Chapel in Compton (1895–1904); and had built and maintained the Watts Gallery (1903–04) for the preservation of her husband's work.

Watts exhibited her work at The Woman's Building at the 1893 World's Columbian Exposition in Chicago, Illinois.

Watts, through the Home Arts and Industries Association (HAIA), worked to create employment for rural communities through the preservation of handicrafts. During the execution of the Watts Mortuary Chapel, Watts trained workers in clay modelling, an initiative that eventually led to the establishment of the Compton Potters' Guild in 1899. She was a firm believer in the idea that anyone given the opportunity could produce things of beauty and that everyone should have a craft within which they could express themselves creatively. She supported the revival of the Celtic style, the indigenous artistic expression of Scotland and Ireland. In 1899, she was asked to design rugs in this style for the carpet company Alexander Morton & Co of Darvel, Liberty's main producer of furnishing fabrics. In cooperation with the Congested Districts Board, Morton had established a workshop in Donegal, Ireland, to employ local women who had little opportunity to earn a livelihood.

Watts pioneered Liberty's Celtic style, with much of the imagery for the Celtic Revival carpets, book-bindings, metalwork, and textiles for Liberty & Co. being based on her earlier designs at the Watts Mortuary Chapel.

Later in life, Watts wrote The Word in the Pattern (1905), which details the use of symbols in the Watts Mortuary Chapel, and completed a three-volume biography of her husband, Annals of an Artist's Life (1912).

== Watts Mortuary Chapel ==
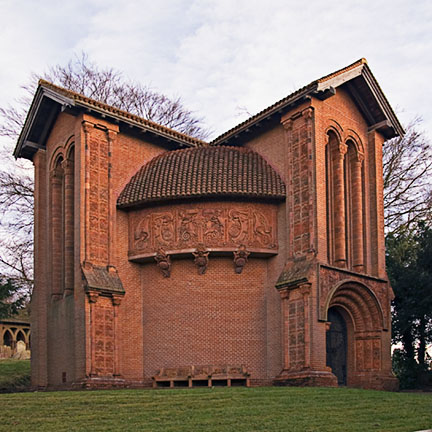
Watts Mortuary Chapel

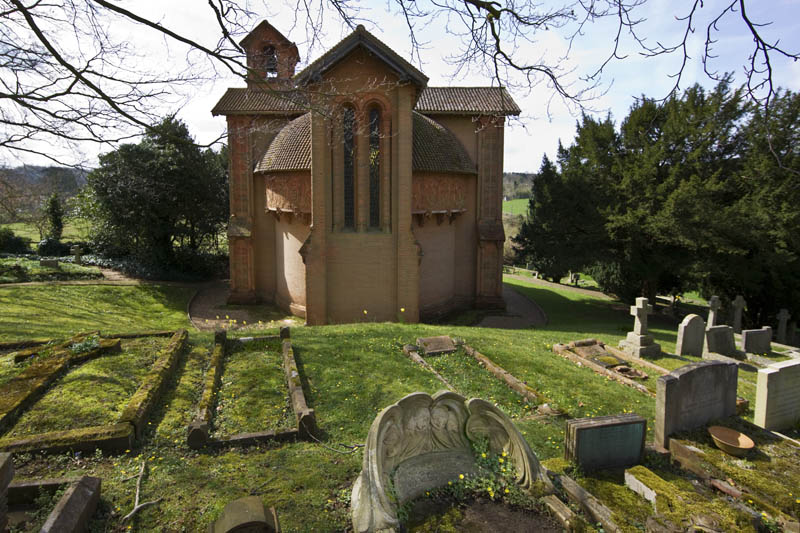
Chapel, showing in foreground terracotta grave marker made in the Compton pottery

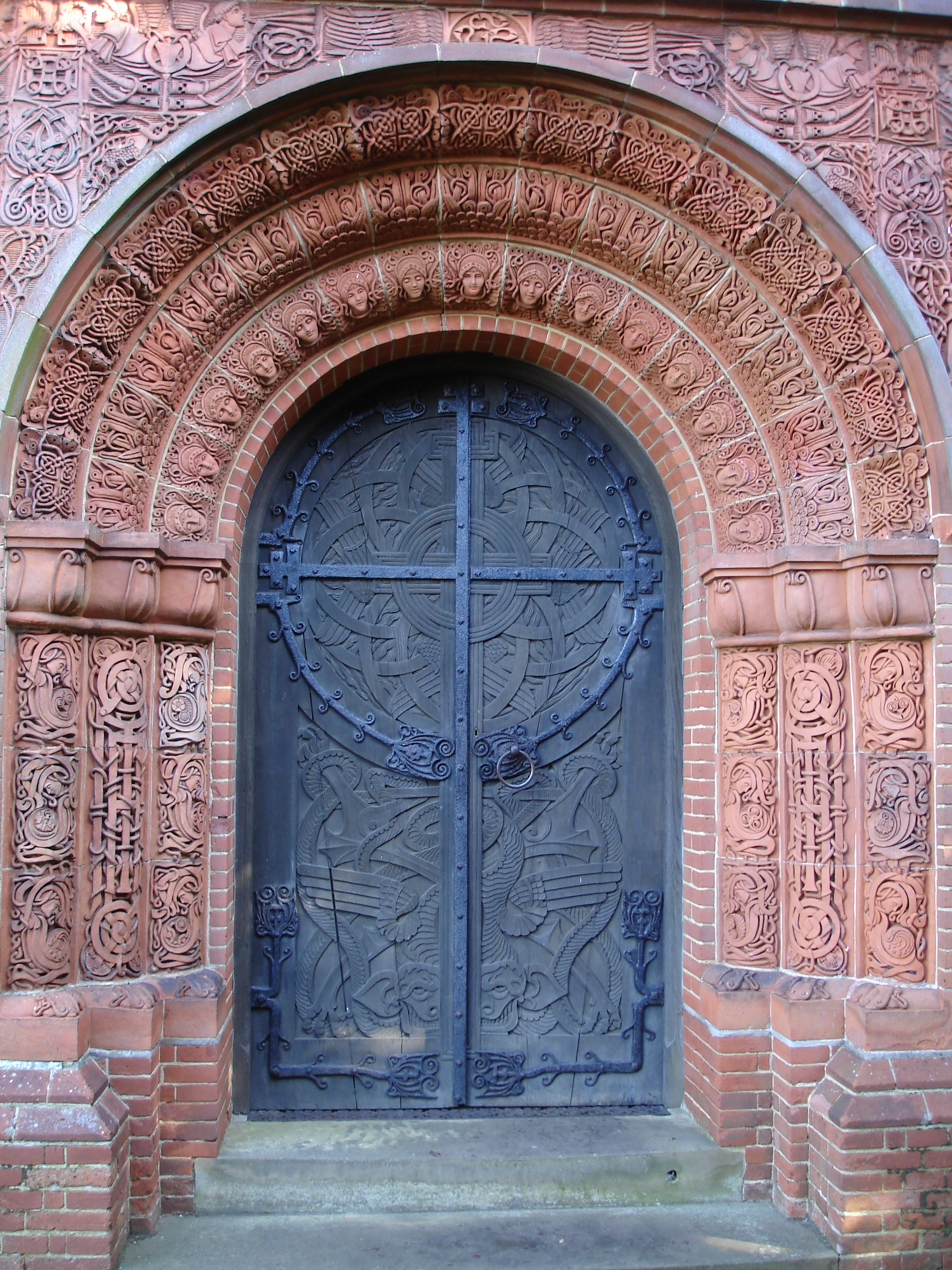
The door

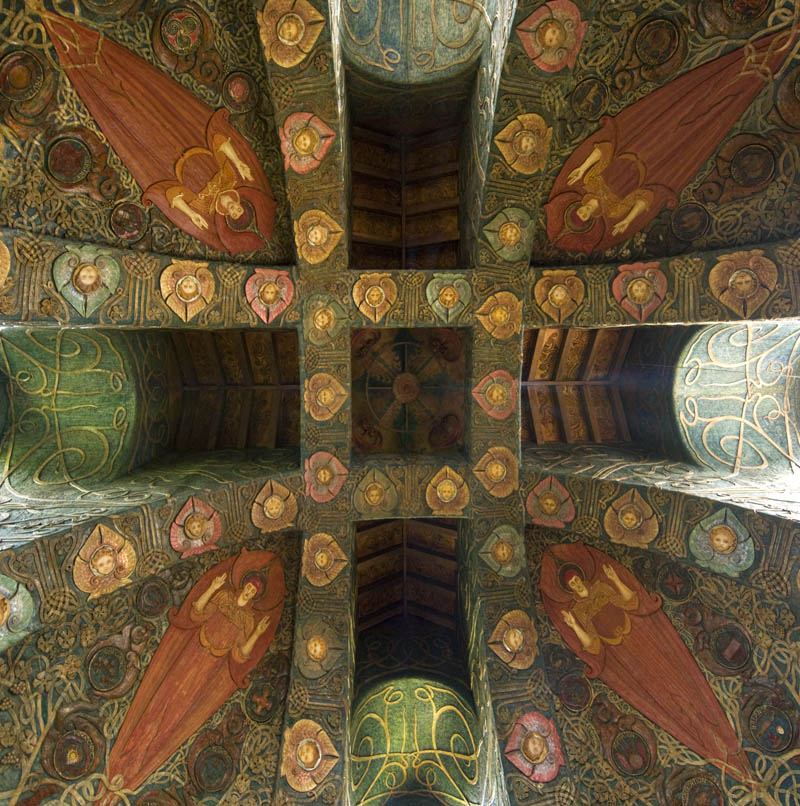
Ceiling apex

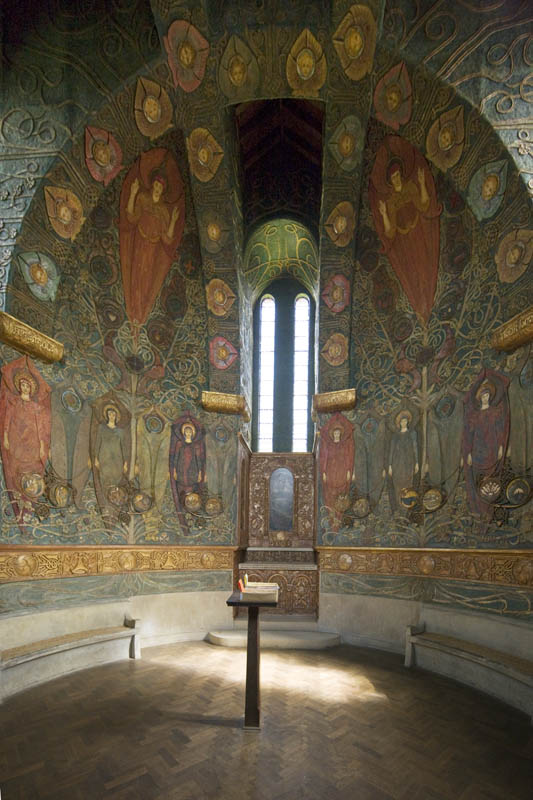
Embrasure & "altar"

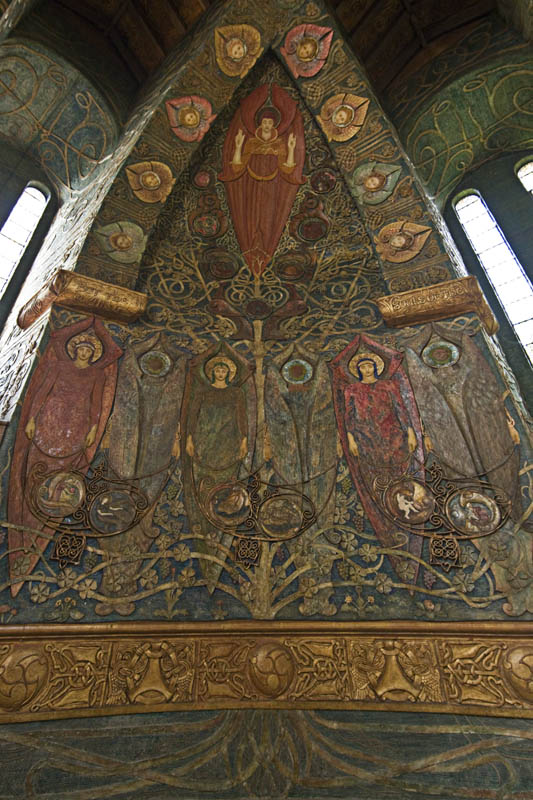
Tree of Life & Seraphs

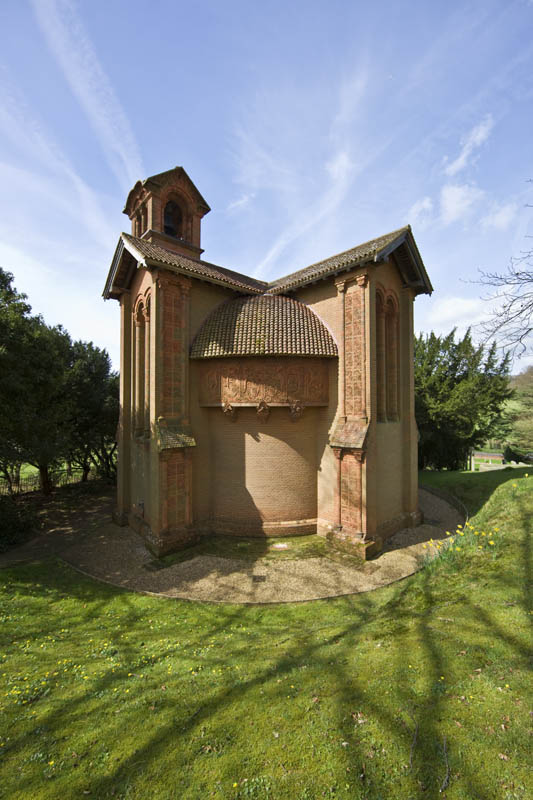
Showing campanile

== See also ==
- Memorial to Heroic Self Sacrifice

== Sources ==
- Barbara Coffey Bryant, "Watts, George Frederic (1817–1904)", Oxford Dictionary of National Biography, Oxford University Press, Sept 2004; online edn, May 2006 accessed 30 Dec 2006
- Veronica Franklin Gould, Mary Seton Watts – Unsung Heroine of the Art Nouveau (1998) ISBN 978-0-9515811-2-4
