= Francis Wolley =

Member of the Parliament of England

Sir Francis Wolley
- Born: 1583
- Died: November 1609 (aged 25–26)
- Spouse: Mary Hawtrey
- Children: Mary Wolley (illegitimate)
- Parent(s): Sir John Wolley, Elizabeth More

Sir Francis Wolley (1583 – November 1609) was the son of Queen Elizabeth's Latin secretary, Sir John Wolley, and Elizabeth More, the daughter of Sir William More of Loseley, Surrey. He was a Member of Parliament, and one of those to whom King James granted the Second Virginia Charter. From 1601 to 1609 he provided a home at Pyrford for John Donne and Anne More after their clandestine marriage.

== Family ==
Francis Wolley, born in 1583, was the son of Queen Elizabeth's Latin secretary, Sir John Wolley, and Elizabeth More, one of the queen's ladies of the Privy Chamber. Wolley's father and mother had both been previously married, Sir John Wolley to Jane Sanderson, and Elizabeth More to Richard Polsted, but neither marriage had produced issue.

Wolley was christened on 4 April 1583. The queen stood godmother, with the Countess of Lincoln, Surrey's "fair Geraldine", acting as her proxy, and both Edward Clinton, 1st Earl of Lincoln, and Robert Dudley, 1st Earl of Leicester, personally present at the ceremony as his godfathers.

== Career ==
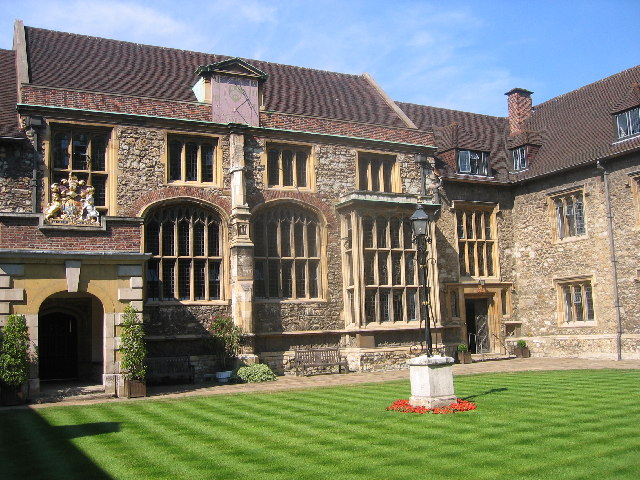
The Charterhouse, where Francis Wolley was knighted

In 1595, when he was only twelve years of age, his father unsuccessfully made suit to have Francis joined with him in his office of Clerk of the Pipe Rolls. Sir John Wolley died on 28 February 1596, and in the same year Wolley entered Merton College, Oxford. In early October 1597, Wolley's mother, Elizabeth, took as her third husband Queen Elizabeth's Lord Chancellor, Thomas Egerton, 1st Viscount Brackley. Wolley was granted the degree of Bachelor of Arts in 1598, and in 1600 entered Lincoln's Inn, an Inn of Court with which his stepfather, Lord Chancellor Egerton, had been closely associated.

In 1600 Wolley exchanged New Year's gifts with Queen Elizabeth. In 1601, at the age of eighteen, he was elected to Parliament for Haslemere, nominated by his uncle, Sir George More, who was lord of the manor. In the same year the poet John Donne, who since 1598 had been secretary to Wolley's stepfather, Lord Chancellor Egerton, secretly married Wolley's first cousin, Anne More (27 May 1584–1617), one of the daughters of Wolley's uncle, Sir George More. More's rage when he learned of the clandestine marriage knew no bounds, and he had Donne dismissed from his position as secretary to Egerton, and imprisoned in the Fleet. After several weeks Donne was set at liberty, but Sir George More refused to reconcile with either Donne or his daughter, and Wolley gave the young couple refuge in his house at Pyrford and 'supplied their worldly wants' until his death in 1609.

Wolley was among the many knights created by King James at the Charterhouse on 11 May 1603, and on 10 August entertained the king and Anne of Denmark at Pyrford. In 1605 he obtained the reversion (i.e. promise of the position when it next fell vacant) of the office of Clerk of the Pipe Rolls which his father had tried to obtain for him a decade earlier, and in 1607 was appointed to the clerkship itself. He also obtained a reversionary interest in the keepership of Folly Park in Windsor Forest.

At Twelfth Night 1608 Wolley is said to have won more than £800 gambling with King James, the Earl of Montgomery, Sir Robert Cecil, Lord Buckhurst and others. The stakes were high; ‘no gamester was admitted that brought not £300’.

On 23 May 1609, Wolley was among the members of the Virginia Company of London to whom King James granted the Second Virginia Charter.

Wolley made his last will 11 August 1609, adding a codicil on 1 November, six days before his death at Pyrford. In the will, which was probated on 12 December, he bequeathed £4,000 for a ‘fair tomb’ to be built in Old St Paul's Cathedral for himself and his parents, and the large sum of £1,300 to various servants. He left the manor of Burgham to his illegitimate daughter, Mary Wolley. Wolley's first cousin, Sir Arthur Mainwaring, son of his mother's sister, Anne More, and her husband, Sir George Mainwaring, was his heir.

== Marriage and issue ==
On 11 September 1594, when he was only eleven years old, Wolley was married to his mother's ward, Mary Hawtrey, the daughter of Sir William Hawtrey (d.1592/3) of Chequers, Buckinghamshire. Her grandfather, William Hawtrey (d.1597), had served as jailer to Lady Mary Grey at Chequers for two years, and left Mary Hawtry £500 in his will.

Sir Francis Wolley and Mary Hawtrey had no issue. By an unnamed mistress, Wolley had an illegitimate daughter, Mary Wolley, who married Sir John Wyrley. The dramatist John Ford dedicated his play The Lady's Trial to his friends 'John Wyrley, esquire' and 'Mistress Mary Wyrley, his wife'.

== Ancestry ==
Ancestors of Francis Wolley

4. John Wolley
2. John Wolley
10. John Buckler
5. Edith Buckler
11.
1. Francis Wolley
24. John More
12. Christopher More
25. Elizabeth
6. William More
13. Margaret Mugge
3. Elizabeth More
14. Ralph Daniell
7. Margaret Daniell
15. Katherine Marrowe
