= Elizabeth Wolley =

- Born: Elizabeth More; 28 April 1552; London
- Died: 21 January 1600 (aged 47)
- Spouse(s): Richard Polsted; Sir John Wolley; Thomas Egerton, 1st Viscount Brackley
- Children: Sir Francis Wolley
- Parent(s): Sir William More, Margaret Daniell

Elizabeth Wolley (née More; 28 April 1552 – 21 January 1600) was one of Queen Elizabeth I's ladies of the Privy Chamber. She was the eldest daughter of Sir William More of Loseley, Surrey, and his second wife, Margaret Daniell, and the wife of the Queen's Latin secretary, Sir John Wolley, and the Queen's Lord Chancellor, Thomas Egerton, 1st Viscount Brackley.

== Family ==
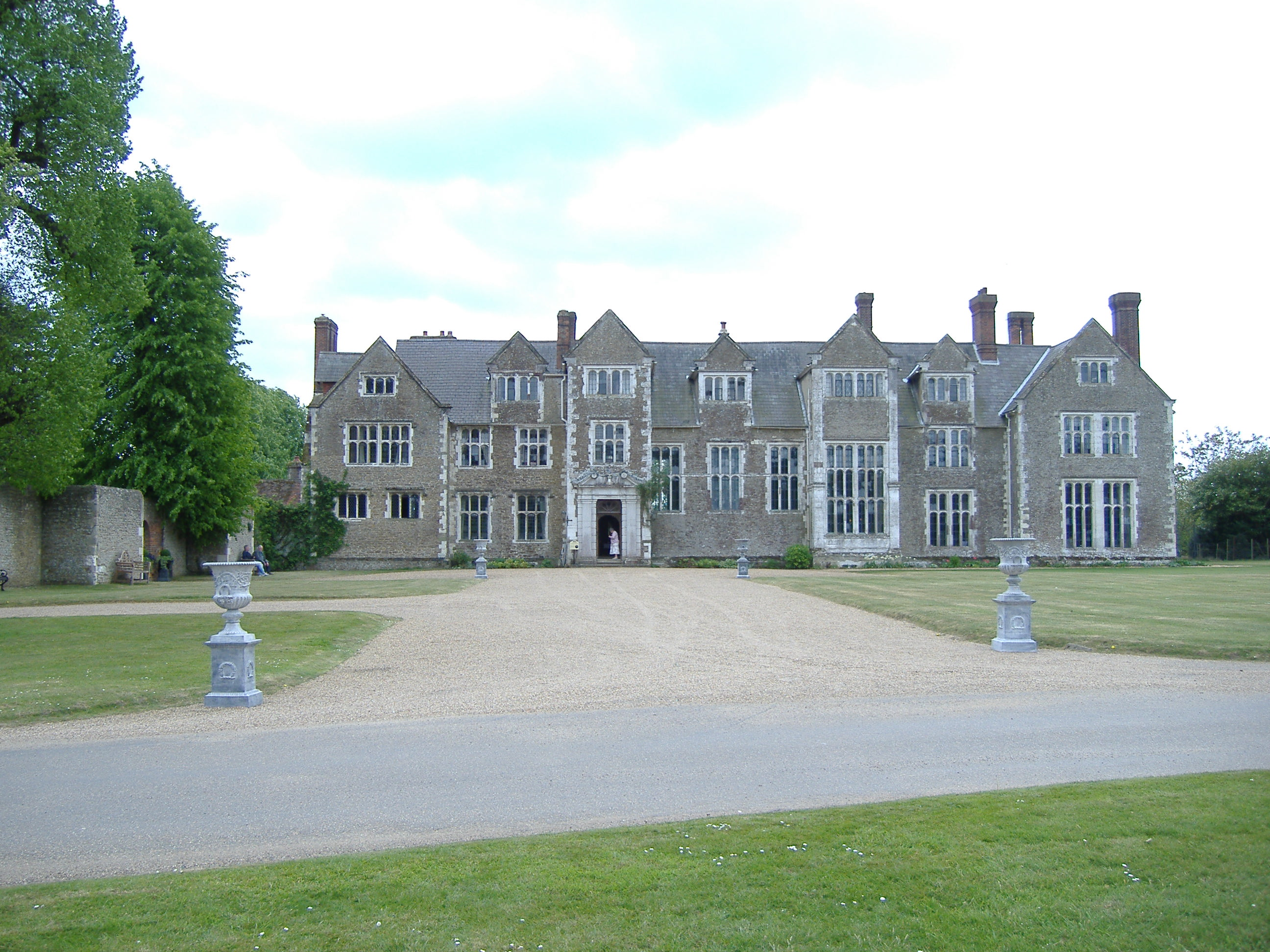
Loseley House, home of Elizabeth Wolley's father, Sir William More

Elizabeth More was born on 28 April 1552, the eldest of the three children of Sir William More of Loseley, Surrey, and his second wife, Margaret Daniell, the daughter and heiress of Ralph Daniell of Swaffham, Norfolk, by Katherine Marrowe. She was born in London at the house of her great-uncle, George Medley (d. 1554), esquire, mercer and Merchant of the Staple, and was baptised 1 May 1552.

A London haberdasher, John Whetstone, was her godfather, and she had two godmothers, her great-aunt, Elizabeth Medley (née Marrowe, wife of George Medley), and her paternal grandmother, Alice Polsted. She had a younger brother, Sir George More, and a younger sister, Anne More (d. 1624), who married Sir George Mainwaring (d. 5 May 1628) of Ightfield, Shropshire.

== Career ==
On 3 November 1567, when she was fifteen, Elizabeth More married Richard Polsted (1545–1576), the son of Henry Polsted (1510–1555) of Albury, Surrey, by Alice Lord, the daughter of Robert Lord or Lawerde. The wedding festivities, which took place at the Blackfriars from 3 to 17 November, were said to be the social event of the year. Among those listed as having given wedding gifts were the Earl of Lincoln and his wife Elizabeth, Anthony Browne, 1st Viscount Montague, Robert Horne, Bishop of Winchester, and Sir William Cecil.

Richard Polsted died on 31 March 1576 at the age of thirty-one, leaving his property to his widow, whose hand was sought by at least three known suitors, Thomas Horsman, Tobias Matthew, and John Wolley. According to McCutcheon, Wolley, who is said to have been some twenty years older than Elizabeth, was a protege of Robert Dudley, 1st Earl of Leicester, a longtime friend of Elizabeth's father, Sir William More. Leicester, acting of behalf of the Queen, had knighted More at the Earl of Lincoln's home at Pyrford in 1576, and Elizabeth More's brother, George, was serving in Leicester's household by 1579. Elizabeth and John Wolley were married at Loseley before 3 July 1577.

Elizabeth Wolley was for many years one of the ladies of Queen Elizabeth I's Privy Chamber. Although the date at which she entered the Queen's service is not known, she was well known to the Queen by 8 October 1581, when her husband wrote to Sir William More saying that the Queen:

is exceeding sorrye for my wives sicknesse, saying she would not lose her swete aple for all the gold in the world.

Two years later, when Elizabeth Wolley's only son, Francis Wolley, was christened on 4 April 1583, the Queen stood godmother, with the Countess of Lincoln acting as her proxy, while both the Earl of Lincoln and the Earl of Leicester were personally present as the child's godfathers.

Elizabeth Wolley is known to have exchanged New Year's gifts with the Queen in 1585, 1589, 1597, 1598, 1599, and 1600. In 1589, she gave Elizabeth a doubet of black stitched cloth of two sorts flourished with Venice gold and silver, and John Wolley gave a cloak of black cloth of gold.

On the evening of 15 September 1595 she attended the queen at hawking with Sir Robert Cecil and they caught three partridges, which Wolley sent to her father. She wrote to her father asking him to ensure her son learnt French, so that his talents would impress the queen. In 1597 Henry Lok included sonnets to a large number of court personages, among them Elizabeth Wolley, in his Ecclesiastes (STC 16696). According to McCutcheon, a copy now in the Huntington Library bears her signature, and was probably the copy presented to her by Lok.

Elizabeth Wolley's second husband, Sir John Wolley, died on 28 February 1596, appointing her sole executrix of his estate. A year and a half later, in early October 1597, she married Lord Chancellor Egerton.

Elizabeth Wolley died in January 1600, and on 4 May 1600 her son, Sir Francis, took over administration of his father's estate. In 1614 the bodies of Elizabeth Wolley, her second husband, Sir John Wolley, and their son, Sir Francis Wolley, were reburied 'between St. George's Chappel and that of our Lady' in Old St Paul's Cathedral, and a magnificent monument was erected there to their memories at a cost of £4,000. She is also depicted on the monument to her parents in the Loseley Chapel in St Nicolas' Church, Guildford.

Several of Elizabeth Wolley's letters have survived in the Loseley manuscripts.

== Ancestry ==
Ancestors of Elizabeth More

8. John More
4. Christopher More
9. Elizabeth
2. William More
5. Margaret Mugge
1. Elizabeth More
6. Ralph Daniell
3. Margaret Daniell
7. Katherine Marrowe
