= John Wolley (MP) =

16th-century English politician

Sir John Wolley
- Died: 1596; Pyrford, Surrey
- Spouse(s): Jane Sanderson; Elizabeth More
- Children: Sir Francis Wolley
- Parent(s): John Wolley, Edith Buckler

Sir John Wolley (died 1596) was Queen Elizabeth I's Latin Secretary, a member of her Privy Council, and a member of Parliament from 1571 until his death in 1596.

== Family ==
John Wolley came of a family which had been settled in Dorset since the time of King Henry III. He was the son of John Wolley of Leigh, Dorset, and Edith Buckler, the daughter of John Buckler, gentleman, of Causeway near Weymouth, Dorset, and sister of Sir Walter Buckler, secretary to Henry VIII's sixth wife, Katherine Parr, and Chamberlain to the future Queen Elizabeth I.

Wolley had a sister, Eleanor Wolley, who married, as his second wife, Edmond Hardy, gentleman, of Toller Whelme, Dorset, and by him had two sons, Francis Hardy and John Hardy, and a daughter, Edith Hardy. Wolley's sister, Eleanor, was a widow when Wolley made his will in 1596.

== Career ==
In 1553 Wolley became a Fellow of Merton College, Oxford. He was granted the degrees of Bachelor of Arts on 11 October 1553, Master of Arts on 1 July 1557, and Doctor of Civil Law on 10 March 1566. He is said to have been in the service of Queen Elizabeth by 1563, obtained 'commendation for his learning and eloquence' in a public disputation before her on 3 September 1566 at the University of Oxford, and was appointed as her secretary for the Latin tongue after the death of Roger Ascham on 30 December 1568 in preference to Bartholomew Clerke, who had the support of the Earl of Leicester, Sir William Cecil and Walter Haddon. In 1569 the Queen granted him the prebend of Compton Dundon, Somerset.

Wolley first became a Member of Parliament in 1571, when he was elected for East Looe. He continued to serve as member for various constituencies for the remainder of his life, being elected for Weymouth and Melcombe Regis in 1572, for Winchester in 1584 and 1586, for Dorset in 1589 and for Surrey in 1596.

On 24 July 1573 Wolley corresponded with the German scholar, Johannes Sturm on the controversial topic of the vestments to be worn by the clergy of the Church of England, stating that he was doing so 'at the desire of my singular good patron, the Earl of Leicester'.

Although Carlyle and Parry state that Wolley had purchased an estate at Pyrford, Surrey, by 1576, and that the Queen honoured him with a visit there in that year, other sources state that Pyrford was owned by Edward Clinton, 1st Earl of Lincoln, until his death in 1585, and that it was Lincoln whom the Queen visited at Pyrford from 12–15 May 1576. It was not until 1589 that Henry Weston obtained licence to alienate Pyrford to Wolley.

On 11 October 1577 the Queen created Wolley Dean of Carlisle, although he was not an ecclesiastic. In June 1586 the Queen sent him on a diplomatic mission to Scotland to reassure King James VI that his mother, Mary, Queen of Scots, was being well treated during her imprisonment in England. Wolley was appointed to the Privy Council on 30 September of that year, and on 25 October was one of the commissioners who tried and convicted the Scottish Queen. After Mary's execution in February 1587, the Queen's wrath fell on Wolley's fellow councillor, William Davison, who had had custody of the warrant for Mary's execution, and Wolley was one of the commissioners appointed to examine Davison for 'expediting' Mary's death.

When the Marprelate tracts appeared in 1588, enraging the ecclesiastical authorities, Wolley and two fellow members of the Privy Council, Lord Cobham and Lord Buckhurst, were commissioned to attempt to find the anonymous author, 'Martin Marprelate'. In 1589 he was appointed Chancellor of the Order of the Garter. In 1590 he became a member of the ecclesiastical Court of High Commission. On 18 July 1591, together with his fellow councillor, Sir John Fortescue, he conducted the initial examination of the religious fanatic, William Hacket.

Wolley was knighted in 1592, and in November of that year was one of those appointed to investigate John Dee's complaint that his service to the Queen had not been properly recognized and compensated. On 20 October 1595, after the death of Sir Thomas Heneage, Wolley made suit to the Queen to be appointed Chancellor of the Duchy of Lancaster, stating that he had served her ‘now upon the point of 30 years’. He was given the post of Clerk of the Pipe from 1592 to 1594.

Wolley's literary interests and literary patronage are suggested by verses he composed for Joannis Juelli Angli … vita et mors (1573) by Laurence Humphrey, and by several books dedicated to him, including A Pleasant Description of the Fortunate Ilandes, called the Ilands of Canaria (1583) by T. Nicholas, Churchyards Challenge (1593) and A Revyving of the Deade (1591) by Thomas Churchyard, and Diarium historicopoeticum (1595) by Robert Moor. Wolley's copy of the latter contains his signature, and after Wolley's death was in the library of the poet, John Donne.

Wolley made his will on 26 February 1596, and died two days later at his house at Pyrford. He was buried in Old St Paul's Cathedral. In 1614 the bodies of Wolley, his wife, Elizabeth, and son, Sir Francis, were reburied ‘between St. George's Chappel and that of our Lady’, and a magnificent monument was erected to their memories at a cost of £4000.

== Marriages and issue ==
Wolley married firstly Jane Sanderson, the daughter of William Sanderson. He married secondly, in 1577, Elizabeth More (born 28 April 1552), one of Queen Elizabeth's ladies of the Privy Chamber. She was the eldest daughter of Sir William More of Loseley, Surrey, and his second wife, Margaret Daniell, and was the widow of Richard Polsted (d. 1576) of Albury, Surrey. They had one son, Sir Francis Wolley (1583–1609), to whom the Queen stood as godmother. After Wolley's death, his widow married Lord Chancellor Egerton.

== Footnotes ==
Church of England titles
Preceded by Thomas Smith	Dean of Carlisle; 1577 – 1596	Succeeded by Christopher Perkins
