= William More (died 1600) =

16th-century English politician

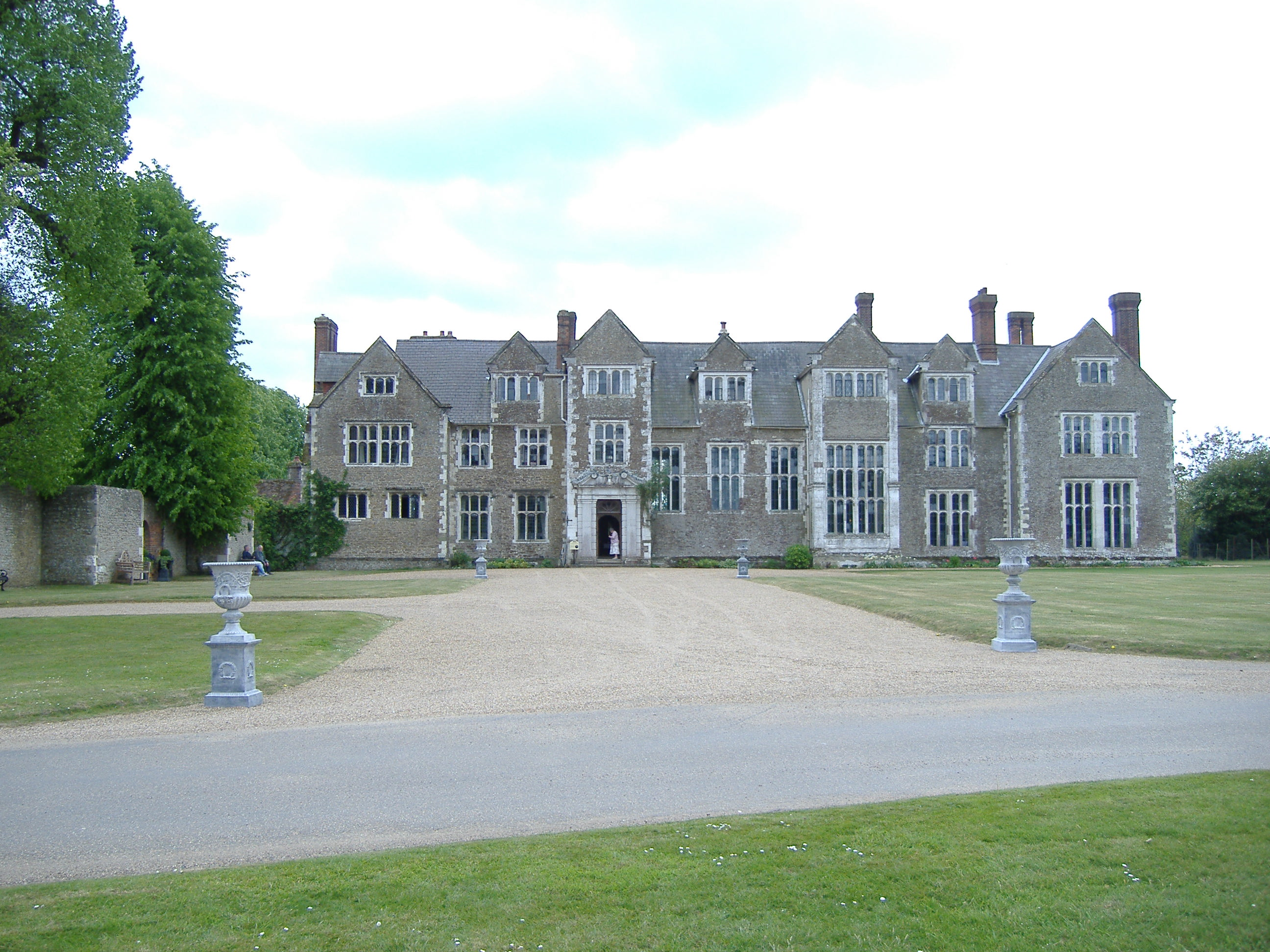
- Loseley House, the home of More
- Born: 30 January 1520
- Died: 20 July 1600 (aged 80)
- Spouses: Mabel Dingley (died); Margaret Daniell
- Children: 3, including Sir George and Elizabeth
- Parents: Sir Christopher More (father); Margaret Mudge (mother)

Sir William More (30 January 1520 – 20 July 1600), of Loseley, Surrey, was the son of Sir Christopher More. The great house at Loseley Park was built for him, which is still the residence of the More Molyneux family. Of Protestant sympathies, as Sheriff and Vice-Admiral of Surrey he was actively involved in local administration of the county of Surrey and in the enforcement of the Elizabethan religious settlement, and was a member of every Parliament during the reign of Queen Elizabeth I. He was the owner of property in the Blackfriars in which the first and second Blackfriars theatres were erected. He has been described as "the perfect Elizabethan country gentleman" on account of his impeccable character and his assiduity and efficiency of service.

== Family ==
William More was the son of Sir Christopher More of Loseley, King's Remembrancer of the Exchequer (c.1483–16 August 1549) and his first wife Margaret, daughter of Walter Mugge or Mudge (died 1495) of Guildford, Surrey, by his wife Joan. (The Mudge arms are blazoned "argent, a chevron between three cockatrices".) William was the grandson of a London citizen and Fishmonger, John More, and his wife Elizabeth. After the death of Margaret Mugge, More's father married, by 1535, Constance Sackville (died 1554), daughter of Richard Sackville and relict of William Heneage, but there was no issue by this second marriage.

More had four brothers (Richard, two brothers named Christopher, and John), all of whom died without issue, and seven sisters, Elizabeth; Cecily; Margaret, who married Thomas Fiennes, brother of the Lord Dacre; Eleanor, who married her stepbrother William Heneage (died 1555) of Milton in Arlington, East Sussex; Bridget, who married a husband surnamed Compton, of Guernsey; Anne, who married John Scarlett; and Elizabeth, who married John Wintershall or Wintershull.

== Career ==
=== Young life ===
No evidence survives of More's education. His political career began early. He was elected to the Parliament of 1539 under King Henry VIII, and both he and his father were elected to the Parliament of 1547, his father as Knight of the Shire and William as the Member for Reigate. In c.1545 he made his first marriage, to Mabel, daughter of Mark Dygneley (or Dingley) of Wolverton Manor in Shorwell, Isle of Wight, a union which was without issue. His father died in 1549: in 1551 he made his second marriage, to Margaret, daughter of Ralph Daniell of Swaffham, Norfolk, and in 1553 his only son and heir, George More, was born.

He avoided entanglement in the political affairs of King Edward's reign, and in particular kept clear of the Duke of Northumberland's attempt to place Lady Jane Grey on the throne in 1553. Even so, More's Protestant sympathies are reflected in his close association with William Parr, 1st Marquess of Northampton, brother of Henry VIII's last wife, Catherine Parr. Northampton appointed More his provost marshal in Surrey in 1552, and in some letters of that time referred to More as his servant. Neither this, nor his close friendship with another Protestant, Sir Thomas Cawarden, prevented the continuation of More's political life under the reversal of religious policy during the reign of Queen Mary I. He was elected three times consecutively, in October 1553, November 1554 and 1555, as MP for Guildford. In the 1555 parliament More opposed the government (but did not absent himself): he 'was hauled before the council for "lewd words" in 1556, and was reprimanded for his remissness in investigating conventicles in 1557'. The Privy Council gave him 'important responsibilities' during the final months of Mary's reign.

=== Elizabethan period ===
With the accession of Elizabeth I, a Protestant sovereign, in November 1558, More's career 'flourished'. A succession of appointments quickly came his way. He was Sheriff of Surrey and Sussex in 1558–9, Vice-Admiral of Sussex from 1559, verderer of Windsor Forest in 1561, Constable of Farnham Castle in 1565, and Deputy Lieutenant for Surrey and Sussex from 1569. He was to serve in every Parliament during Elizabeth's reign. He was Member for Grantham in Lincolnshire in 1559, sat as Knight of the Shire for Surrey in 1563 and 1571, and as Member for Guildford in 1572.

From 1562 to 1568 More built Loseley House (Loseley Park), in Artington, Surrey, described as 'the best house of its date in the county'. The mansion, of grey stone with mullioned and transomed windows, consists of one principal three-storey range with a broad cross-gable at either end of the frontage and two projecting gabled bays between them, leaving three recessed bays, all rising to the attic storey. The great hall, 42 feet long and 25 feet wide, has a bay window containing glass painted with the More arms. The main entrance to the hall was formerly through a porch which opened into the screens passage between the hall and the kitchens. The house was originally intended to enclose a quadrangle, by the construction of at least two additional wings: but although one such wing was actually built by Sir George More (Sir William's son), it was later demolished.

There are indications that Queen Elizabeth visited Loseley in her progresses in 1567 and in 1569, when the building was approaching completion. Elizabeth certainly visited in 1577 (the year after he received the dignity of knighthood), and he was Sheriff of Surrey a second time for 1579–80. During the 1570s More extended his patronage to George Austen of Shalford, and secured for him the position of Clerk of the Peace for Surrey in 1577.

=== Southampton's confinement at Loseley ===
More was appointed a commissioner for ecclesiastical causes in 1572, and both before and after that appointment he was active in the enforcement of religious reform, dealing with sects such as the Family of Love as well as with Catholic recusants. Despite this, More was a lifelong friend of Anthony Browne, 1st Viscount Montague, who had Catholic sympathies and who openly opposed the Elizabethan religious settlement. More was also a friend of Montague's son-in-law, Henry Wriothesley, 2nd Earl of Southampton, who was twice confined under his guardianship at Loseley. On 15 July 1570 the Privy Council placed Southampton in More's custody after it was learned that he had secretly met with John Lesley, Bishop of Ross, in Lambeth Marsh. More was instructed to induce Southampton to take part in Protestant devotions in his household. Southampton, having done so, was allowed his freedom in November 1570.

However, in September 1571 the Bishop of Ross, under questioning about the Ridolfi plot, incriminated Southampton by revealing the entire contents of their secret conversation at Lambeth. Southampton was arrested at the end of October and confined to the Tower for eighteen months. When released on 1 May 1573, he was again placed in More's custody at Loseley until 14 July. Montague expressed his undying gratitude for More's hospitality, whose relations with Southampton remained more than cordial. On 6 October 1573 Southampton wrote elatedly to More to announce the birth of his son and heir, Henry Wriothesley, 3rd Earl of Southampton.

=== More and the Blackfriars ===
On 12 March 1550, Edward VI granted to Sir Thomas Cawarden (More's friend) a large part of the site of the former Blackfriars monastery in London, which Sir Thomas had been leasing since 4 April 1548. Cawarden died in 1559, and More, his executor, acquired the property in that year from Lady Cawarden. According to More's own memoranda, and other documents, he leased part of that property on 10 June 1560 to Sir Henry Neville and subsequently (at Neville's request) to Richard Farrant, who converted the premises into a playhouse for the Children of the Chapel. Farrant also sublet part of the premises, which caused More to claim that Farrant had forfeited his lease: but, before More could regain possession, Farrant died on 30 November 1580 bequeathing the lease to his widow, Anne daughter of Richard Bower (died 1561), Master of the Choristers of the Chapel Royal.

Farrant having died, Robert Dudley, 1st Earl of Leicester intervened on behalf of William Hunnis, Master of the Children of the Chapel, and on 20 December 1581 the widow Anne Farrant sublet the Blackfriars premises to Hunnis and John Newman. Hunnis and Newman later transferred their interest to a Welsh scrivener, Henry Evans. Evans sold his sublease to Edward de Vere, 17th Earl of Oxford, who retained it for some months before granting it in June 1583 to his servant John Lyly. Sir William More then brought suit in June 1583 against Evans, and in Michaelmas term 1583 Anne Farrant, having appealed to Sir Francis Walsingham, brought suit against Hunnis and Newman. In November 1583 Hunnis petitioned the Queen, and in January 1584 both Hunnis and Newman sued Anne Farrant. Finally, after a year's delay, More had judgement in his favour against Evans: he was granted possession of the Blackfriars property in Easter term 1584, and the first Blackfriars Theatre was closed.

In January 1596 More sold part of his property in the Blackfriars for £600 to James Burbage, who turned it into the second Blackfriars Theatre. However residents of the Blackfriars successfully petitioned the Privy Council to forbid playing there, and in 1599 Burbage leased the property to the same Henry Evans whom More had previously sued.

=== Later years ===
More was knighted by Robert Dudley, Earl of Leicester, in the Queen's presence, at Pyrford, Surrey (the seat of Sir John Wolley), on 14 May 1576. He received (as it appears) two further visits of the Queen at Loseley Park, in 1583 and again in 1591. In Parliament, More sat again as Knight of the Shire for Surrey in 1584 and 1586, as Member for Guildford in 1589, for the Shire again in 1593, and lastly for Guildford in 1597. He was appointed a Chamberlain of the Exchequer in 1591 and, making George Austen his deputy, held that office until his death.

More died 20 July 1600. He was buried in the Loseley Chapel in St. Nicolas' Church, Guildford, where a monument depicts More, his second wife, Margaret Daniel, and their three children. His tomb was a large altar monument with recumbent figures in alabaster of Sir William and his wife Margaret, and was set up by his son Sir George More. Sir William was shown in armour, with a large sword and a long beard. A lengthy inscription is surmounted by two small statues, one of a youth blowing bubbles, and one of Time, with scythe and hour-glass.

Many letters and other documents concerning Sir William More have survived in the Loseley manuscripts. Among these are a series of letters from his servant Charles Bradshawe who was buying paintings from a painter, "Master Wanslee" in London, with frames and labels. Bradshaw asked the painter to copy portraits, including the queen's, owned by the Earl of Lincoln.

== Marriages and issue ==
More married first, before 12 June 1545, Mabel Dingley, the daughter of Mark or Marchion Dingley of Wolverton Manor, Shorwell, in the Isle of Wight. There was no issue of the marriage, and after her death More married, by 1551, Margaret Daniell, the daughter and heiress of Ralph Daniell of Swaffham, Norfolk, by Katherine Marrowe, by whom he had a son and two daughters:

- Sir George More, who married first Anne Poynings (died 19 November 1590), daughter of Sir Adrian Poynings of Mount Poynings, Burngate, West Lulworth, Dorset, and secondly Constance Michell, daughter of John Michell the younger of Stammerham, near Horsham, Sussex. Sir George More had a son, Sir Robert More, and five daughters: Mary, who married Sir Nicholas Throckmorton, later Carew; Margaret, who married Sir Thomas Grimes; Frances, who married Sir John Oglander; Elizabeth, who married Sir John Mill; and Anne, who married the poet John Donne.
- Elizabeth More, who married first Richard Polstead (died 1576), secondly Sir John Wolley, and thirdly, Lord Chancellor Egerton.
- Anne More (died 1624), who married Sir George Mainwaring (died 5 May 1628) of Ightfield, Shropshire.

== Sources ==
=== Oxford Dictionary of National Biography ===
- Ives, E.W. (2008). "More, Sir John (c.1451–1530)". Oxford Dictionary of National Biography (online ed.). Oxford University Press. doi:10.1093/ref:odnb/19183. (Subscription, Wikipedia Library access or UK public library membership required.) (subscription required)
- Knafla, Louis A. (2004). "More, Sir George (1553–1632)". Oxford Dictionary of National Biography (online ed.). Oxford University Press. doi:10.1093/ref:odnb/19177. (Subscription, Wikipedia Library access or UK public library membership required.) (subscription required)
- Parry, Glyn (2004). "Wolley, Sir John (d. 1596)". Oxford Dictionary of National Biography (online ed.). Oxford University Press. doi:10.1093/ref:odnb/29844. (Subscription, Wikipedia Library access or UK public library membership required.) (subscription required)
- Robison, William B. (2008). "Cawarden, Sir Thomas (c.1514–1559)". Oxford Dictionary of National Biography (online ed.). Oxford University Press. doi:10.1093/ref:odnb/37270. (Subscription, Wikipedia Library access or UK public library membership required.) (subscription required)
- Robison, William B. (2004). "More, Sir Christopher (b. in or before 1483, d. 1549)". Oxford Dictionary of National Biography (online ed.). Oxford University Press. doi:10.1093/ref:odnb/77080. (Subscription, Wikipedia Library access or UK public library membership required.) (subscription required)

=== History of Parliament ===
- More, William (1520–1600), History of Parliament, pt 1
- More, William (1520–1600), History of Parliament, pt 2
- More, Christopher (1483–1549), History of Parliament
- Wolley, John (d.1596), History of Parliament
- Mainwaring, George (1551–1628), History of Parliament
- Michell, John (1555–1555), History of Parliament
- Poynings, Adrian (1515–1571), History of Parliament

=== Other ===
- Loseley Manuscripts, Folger Shakespeare Library
