= Newark Priory =

Ruined priory in Surrey, England

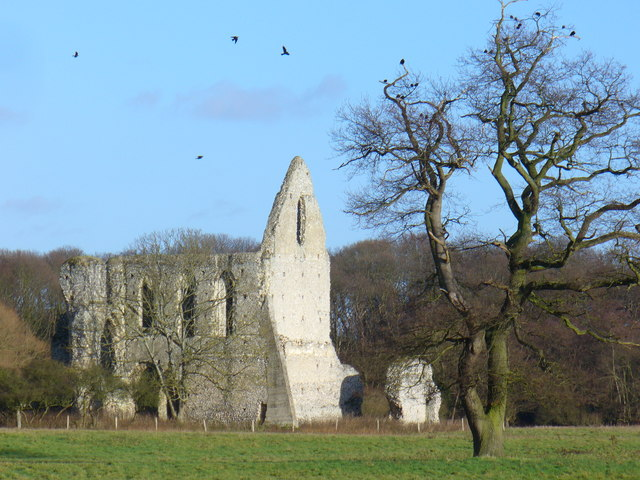
- The remains of Newark Priory
- Interactive map of Newark Priory

Monastery information
- Order: Augustinian
- Established: between 1189-1199
- Disestablished: 1538
- Dedication: Virgin Mary and Thomas Becket
- Diocese: Diocese of Guildford
- Controlled churches: Old Woking, with its chapels of Horsell and Pyrford; Send; St. Martha, St Marth's Hill, Guildford; Wanborough; Weybridge; Windlesham with its chapel; Leigh all in Surrey; and Shipton with its (suspected near Snoddington Manor) chapel of Snodington, Hampshire.

People
- Founders: Rauld de Calva and his wife Beatrice de Saudes
- Important associated figures: Richard Lipscombe, Lord Onslow

Site
- Location: Pyrford, Surrey, England
- Coordinates: 51.3089°N 0.5068°W
- Visible remains: Yes
- Public access: No

Scheduled monument
- Official name: Newark Priory: an Augustinian priory north of the River Wey
- Designated: 20 November 1925
- Reference no.: 1008303

Listed Building – Grade I
- Official name: Ruins of Newark Priory
- Designated: 14 June 1967
- Reference no.: 1377835

Newark Priory is a ruined priory on an island surrounded by the River Wey and its former leat (the Abbey Stream) near the boundary of the village (parish lands) of Ripley and Pyrford in Surrey, England.

== History ==
Newark Priory was, before its reconstruction, run by the Canons Regular of St Augustine and the register of Bishop Woodlock (1312) states that the priory was first founded by a Bishop of Winchester.

The Priory was granted substantial lands "to the canons there serving God" in the late 12th Century by Rauld de Calva and his wife Beatrice de Sandes for the Augustinian canons "to build a church" when Richard I reigned (1189–99) so according with its Early English Gothic architecture, the present priory dates to then. It was dedicated to the Virgin Mary and Saint Thomas Becket in contemporary documents "Thomas the Martyr" and originally, the land where the church was built was called Aldbury. This gradually changed its name from Aldbury to Newark or the New Place (novo loco) of St Thomas near Guildford, at one point being called Newstead.

The taxation roll of 1291 shows considerable non-ecclesiastic assets (temporalities). The priory held tenements or rents in ten London parishes, producing an income of £5 16s 3d; in the wider Diocese of London; in the Diocese of Rochester £1 6s was produced annually; and in Diocese of Winchester income of £27 10s 3½d.

During Henry VIII's dissolution of the monasteries Newark Priory was dissolved. The prior himself was pensioned off, all valuables sent to the Tower of London and the land given to the Master of the King's Horse. It has been said that a cannon was employed from the top of Church Hill to bombard or demolish what were the then extensive buildings. This incident is portrayed in one of a series of paintings made by artist Tessa Kewen. The last known prior of Newark Priory was Richard Lipscombe, appointed just before the surrender of the establishment and lands in 1538. The building, falling into ruin, was said to have been further destroyed by locals using the stones for road mending until Lord Onslow, the owner in the 1730s, decided to preserve what remained.

== Today ==
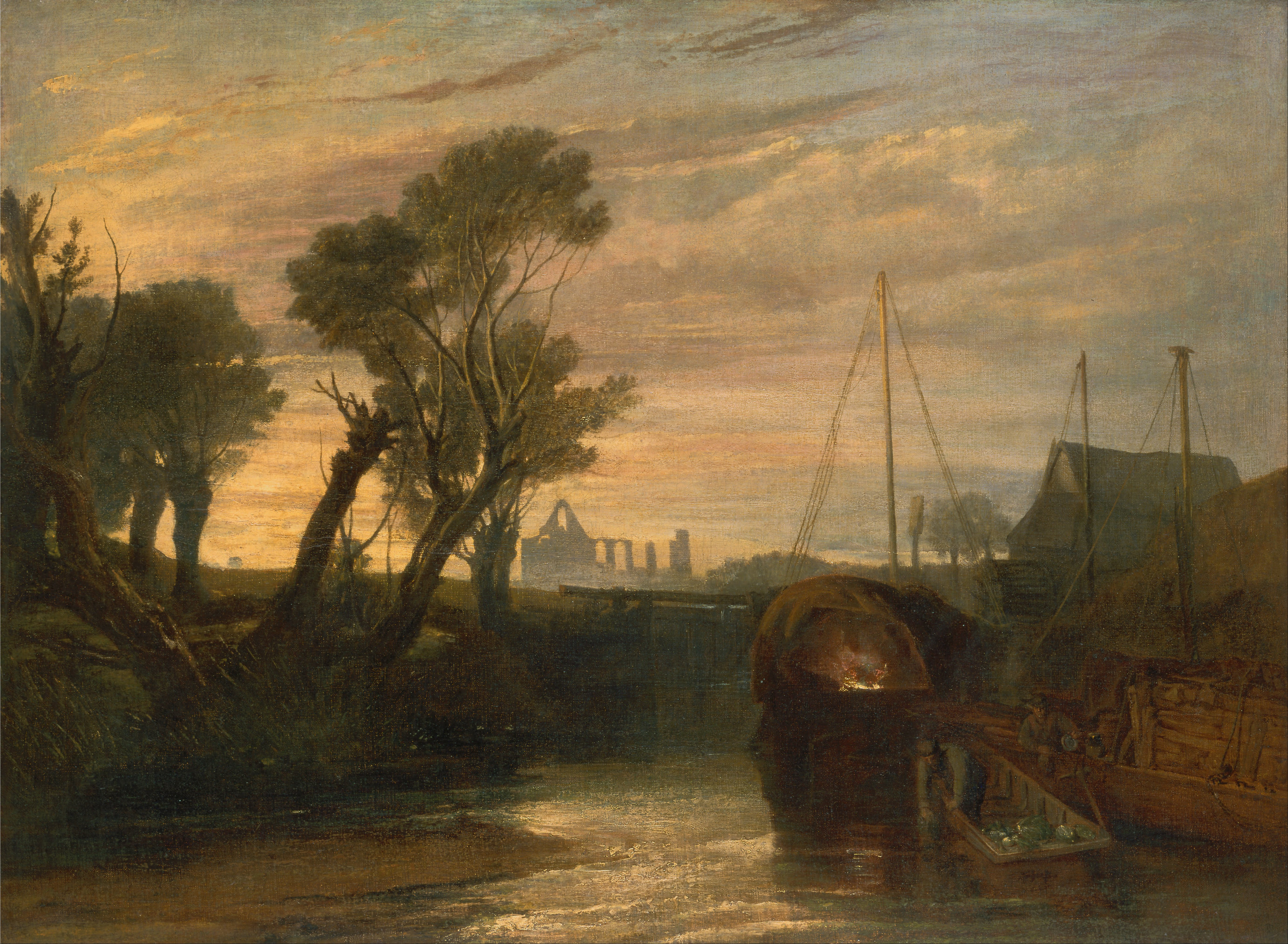
Newark Abbey by J.M.W. Turner, 1807

Newark Priory still exists as ruins today and is a scheduled monument and a Grade I listed building. It was placed upon the English Heritage Register of Buildings at risk, established in 2007. It is located upon private land so is unable to be reached at closer proximity than the Wey path by Newark Lock and Newark Mill. Its island of a few acres is a meadow crossed at its end by Newark Lane between Pyrford and Ripley.

A dawn service is held each year on Easter Day at 6am in the ruins, run by churches from the surrounding towns including Byfleet, West Byfleet, Pyrford and Ripley.

== See also ==
- List of monastic houses in Surrey
- List of monastic houses in England
