= Newark Abbey (painting) =

Painting by J. M. W. Turner

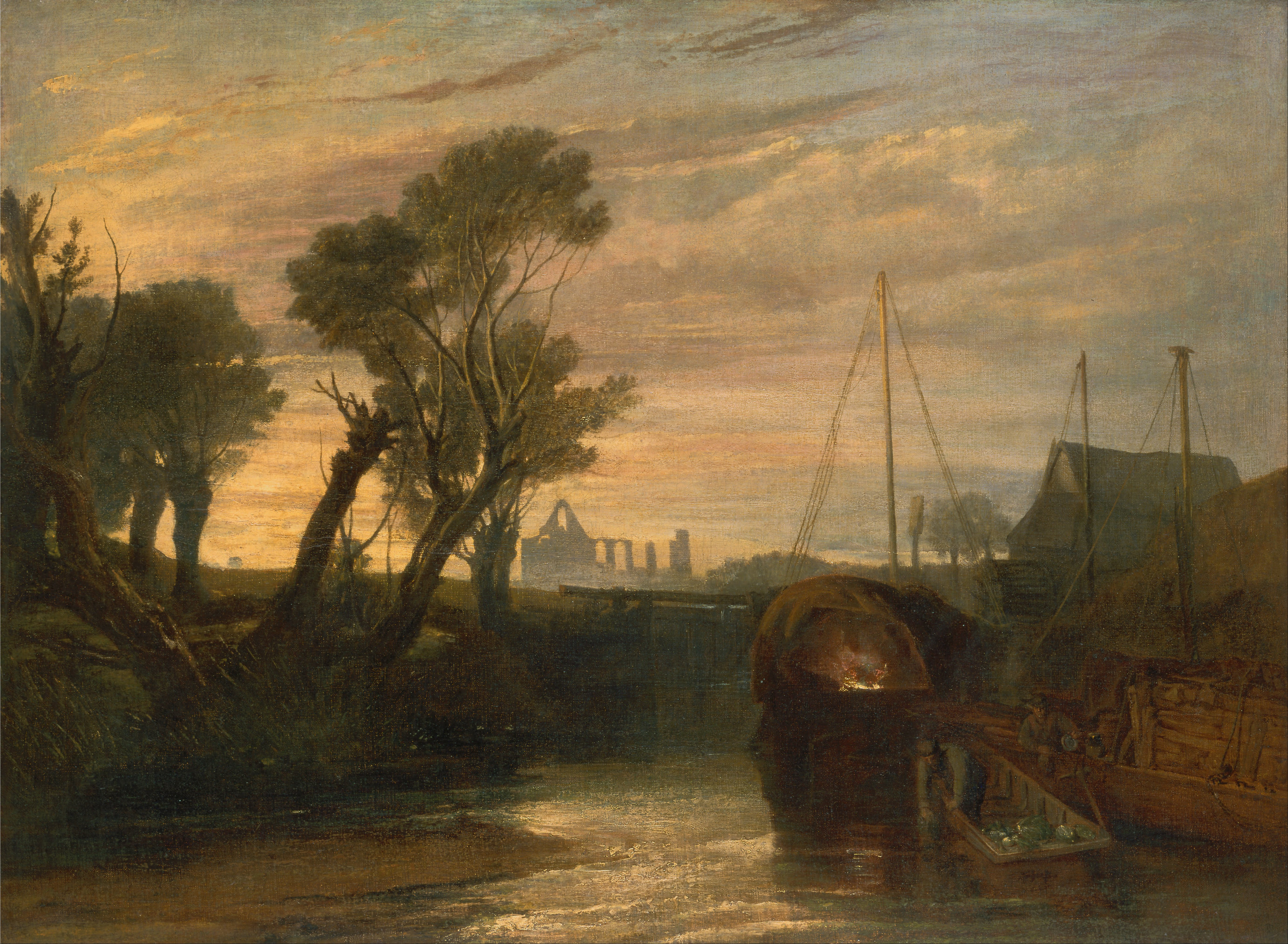
- Artist: J. M. W. Turner
- Year: c.1807
- Type: Oil on canvas, landscape painting
- Dimensions: 91.4 cm × 123.2 cm (36.0 in × 48.5 in)
- Location: Yale Center for British Art; Connecticut

Newark Abbey is a c.1807 landscape painting by the British artist J.M.W. Turner. It depicts a view on the River Wey, a tributary of the River Thames, near Weybridge in Surrey. It features the ruins of Newark Priory, once a Augustinian monastery before the Dissolution of the monasteries by Henry VIII in the distance. The foreground is dominated by the river. Aboard a barge workers prepare an evening meal in the sunset, seemingly oblivious to the historic ruins behind them. It is also known as Newark Abbey on the Wey.

This was a major product of Turner's 1805 tour of the Thames and its tributaries. It reflected a move away from the more topographical views he had produced to focus more on atmosphere. Rather than display it at the Royal Academy, Turner chose to exhibit it at his own studio in Queen Anne Street in Marylebone where it was purchased by Sir John Leicester for 200 guineas. After his death in 1827 it was owned by Thomas Lawrence, the President of the Royal Academy and a friend of Turner. Today the painting is in the Yale Center for British Art in Connecticut as part of the Paul Mellon Collection. A number of other different depictions of Newark Priory by Turner exist including two oil sketchs in the Tate Britain.

== See also ==
- List of paintings by J. M. W. Turner

== Bibliography ==
- Bailey, Anthony. J.M.W. Turner: Standing in the Sun. Tate Enterprises, 2013.
- Moyle, Franny. Turner: The Extraordinary Life and Momentous Times of J. M. W. Turner. Penguin Books, 2016.
- Schneer, Jonathan. The Thames: England's River. Little, Brown Book Group, 2015.
