= Christopher More =

Member of the Parliament of England

Sir Christopher More
- Born: c. 1483
- Died: 16 August 1549 (aged 65–66)
- Spouses: Margaret Mugge or Mudge; Constance Sackville
- Children: Sir William More; Richard More; Christopher More; Christopher More (again); John More; Elizabeth More; Cecily More; Margaret More; Eleanor More; Bridget More; Anne More; Elizabeth More (again)
- Parent(s): John More, Elizabeth (surname unknown)

Sir Christopher More (c. 1483 – 16 August 1549) was an English administrator, landowner, and Member of Parliament. More was the son of John More, a London fishmonger, and his wife, Elizabeth. He was active in local administration in Sussex and Surrey, and from 1505 until his death held office in the Exchequer, rising in 1542 to the post of King's Remembrancer. His sister, Alice More, was the fourth wife of Sir John More, father of Sir Thomas More.

== Family ==
Christopher More, born about 1483, was the grandson of Thomas More of Norton, Derbyshire. He was the son of a London fishmonger, John More, and his wife, Elizabeth. He had a brother, Robert More of London, who married a wife named Mary, and two sisters, Alice (d. 1545), who married firstly John Clerke, and secondly Sir John More, father of Sir Thomas More, and Anne, who married John Lucas of Halden, Kent.

== Career ==
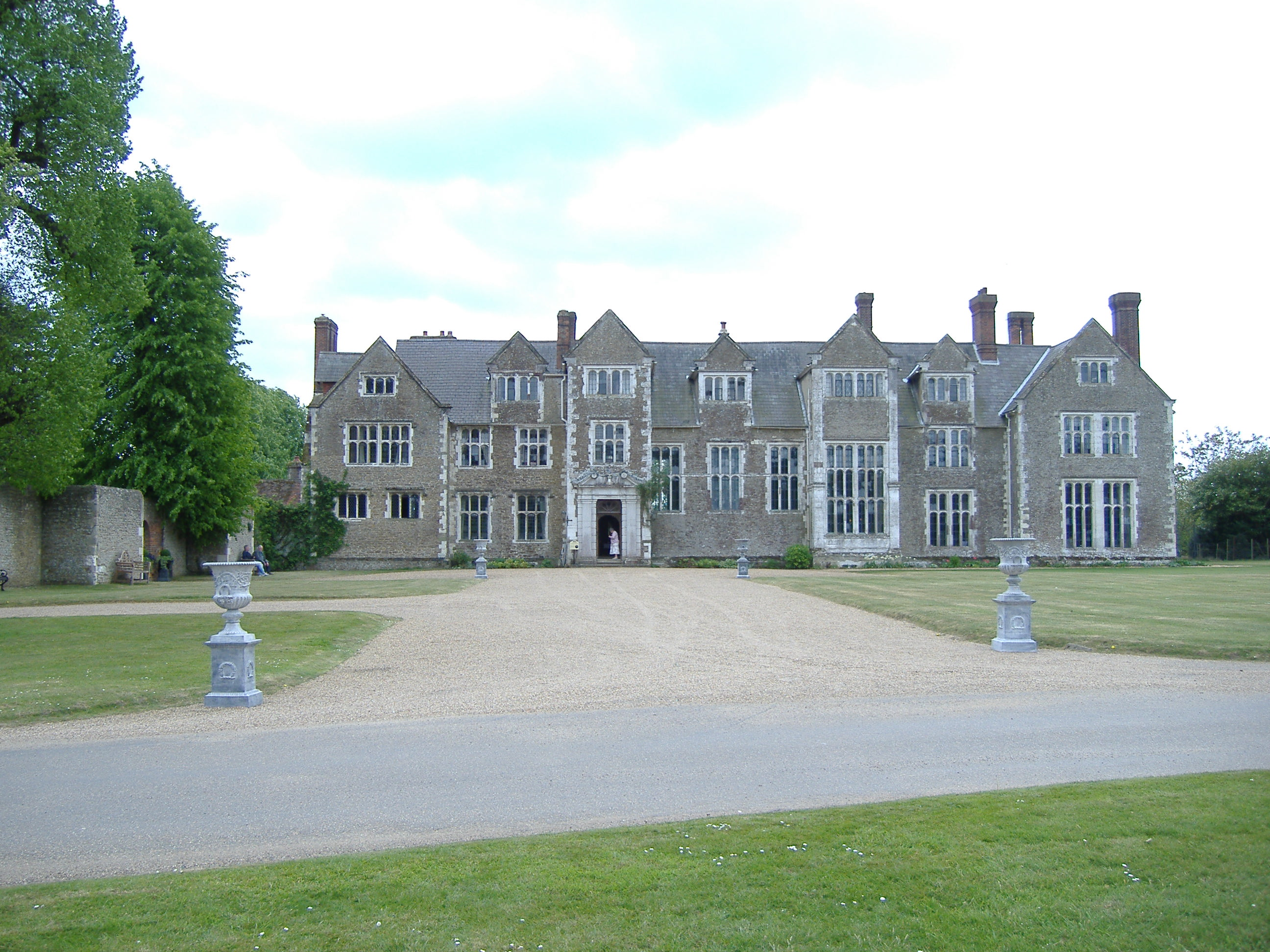
Loseley today; the property was purchased by Sir Christopher More about 1509

More was a clerk in the Exchequer by 1505, and in the same year purchased the office of alnager for Surrey and Sussex. He was admitted to the Inner Temple in 1513, becoming one of the first officers in the Exchequer known to have been formally trained in the law.

He served as Commissioner for the Subsidy in Surrey on several occasions from 1515 on, and by 1519 had been appointed verderer of Windsor Forest. In 1521 he was surveyor of the lands of Margaret Pole, Countess of Salisbury. He was appointed Justice of the Peace in Surrey in 1522 and in Sussex in 1534, and continued to serve in that capacity in both counties until his death. During the years between 1530 and 1546 he served on various commissions in Surrey and Sussex, and was appointed Sheriff of Sussex and Surrey in 1532-3 and again in 1539-40.

In November 1539, he was among those appointed to attend as a guard of honour to meet Henry VIII's future Queen, Anne of Cleves. He was knighted between August 1540 and February 1541, and by 1542 had risen in the Exchequer to the position of King's Remembrancer. By 1547, he was steward of the manor of West Horsley in Surrey. He was elected to Parliament as Knight of the Shire for Surrey in 1539, and again in 1547.

More is said to have been the first member of his family to settle in Surrey, and about 1509 he purchased the manor of Loseley, near Guildford. After his initial purchase of Loseley, More acquired other properties in the neighbourhood, as well as properties elsewhere in Surrey and Sussex, and in 1530 was granted licence to empark 200 acres at Loseley. After the Dissolution, More also purchased some former monastic lands.

More made his will on 28 June 1549, appointing as executors his second wife, Constance, and son, William, and as overseer Constance's brother, John Sackville. He added a codicil on 8 July 1549 requiring Constance to enter into sureties to her stepson, William, concerning property in the Blackfriars, London. More died 16 August 1549, and was buried in the Loseley Chapel in St. Nicolas' Church, Guildford.

== Marriages and issue ==
More married firstly, Margaret Mugge or Mudge, the daughter of Walter Mugge or Mudge of Guildford, Surrey, by whom he had five sons, Sir William More, Richard, two sons named Christopher, and John, and seven daughters, Elizabeth; Cecily; Margaret, who married Thomas Fiennes, a brother of Lord Dacre; Eleanor, who married William Heneage of Milton; Bridget, who married a husband surnamed Compton, of Guernsey; Anne, who married John Scarlett; and Elizabeth, who married John Wintershall or Wintershull.

More married secondly, by 1535, Constance Sackville, widow of William Heneage (d. 10 June 1525). She was the daughter of Richard Sackville (d. 28 July 1524), esquire, of Withyham, Sussex, and the sister of John Sackville. Constance survived him, and died at Shalford, Surrey, on 29 March 1554.
