= George Mainwaring (MP, died 1628) =

English politician

Sir George Mainwaring (before 1551 – 1628) was an English politician.

He was the only son of Sir Arthur Mainwaring, MP for Ightfield, Shropshire, and was educated at Shrewsbury School (1562) and the Inner Temple (1565). He succeeded his father in 1590 and was knighted c. 1593.

He was elected to the Parliament of England as the MP for Shropshire in 1572. He was a justice of the peace for Shropshire by 1593, was appointed custos rotulorum of Shropshire c.1593-96, and a deputy lieutenant by 1608. He was also a member of the Council of the Marches of Wales by 1617.

He married Anne, the daughter of William More of Loseley Park, Surrey, and had 4 sons and a daughter, including:

- Sir Arthur Mainwaring
- Sir Henry Mainwaring
- Margaret Mainwaring (d. 1654), wife of Sir Richard Baker
