= Ripley, Surrey =

Village in Surrey, England

Coordinates: 51°17′52″N 0°29′17″W

Ripley
- Village and civil parish
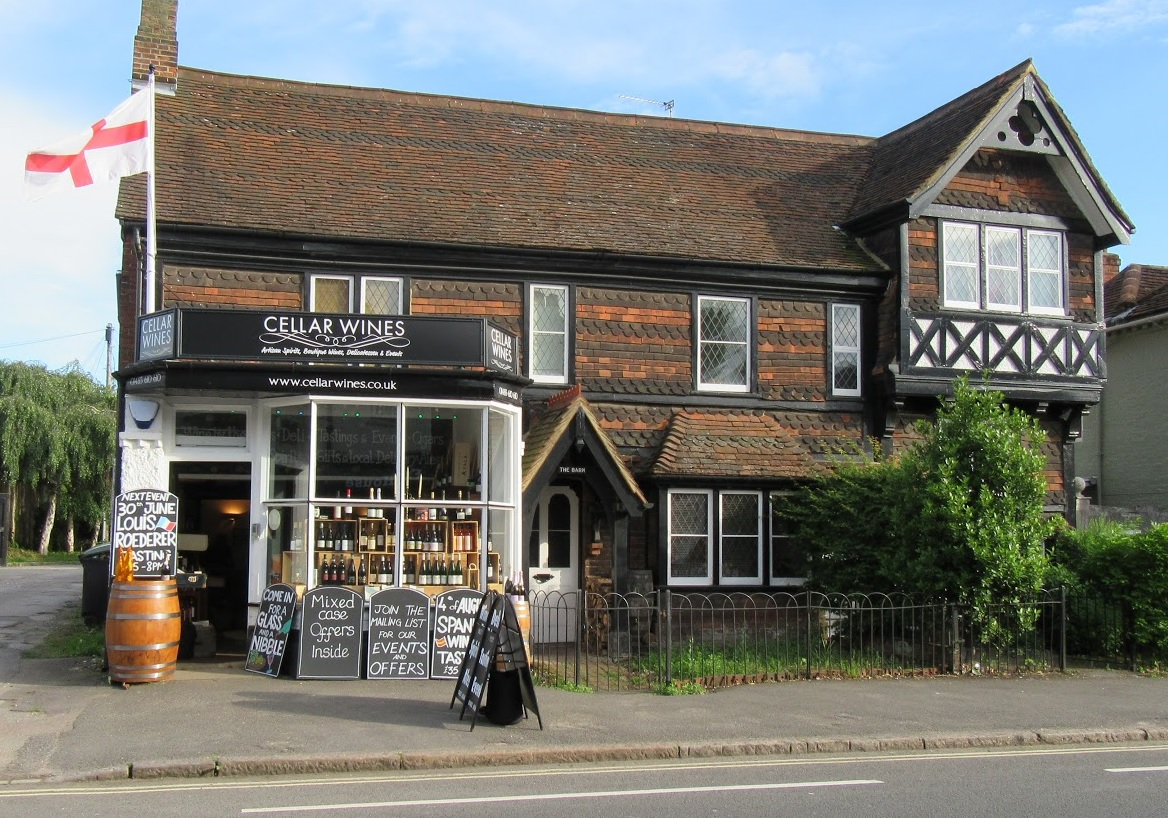
- The Barn & Little Barn

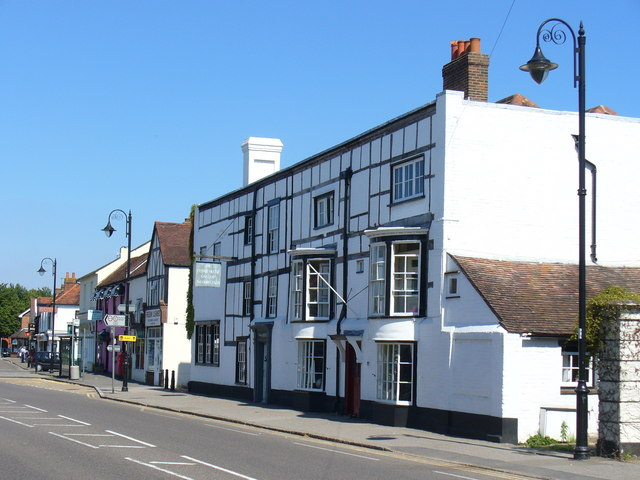
- Cedar House and Tudor House, High Street

- Location within Surrey
- Area: 9.27 km^{2} (3.58 sq mi)
- Population: 2,029 (Civil Parish 2011)
  - Density: 219/km^{2} (570/sq mi)
- OS grid reference: TQ055565
- Civil parish: Ripley
- District: Guildford
- Shire county: Surrey
- Region: South East
- Country: England
- Sovereign state: United Kingdom
- Post town: Woking
- Postcode district: GU23
- Dialling code: 01483
- Police: Surrey
- Fire: Surrey
- Ambulance: South East Coast
- UK Parliament: Guildford

Ripley is a village and civil parish in Surrey, England. It is centred 6.2 miles (10.0 km) southeast of Woking, 6.8 miles (10.9 km) northeast of Guildford and 22.5 miles (36.2 km) southwest of London. Neighbouring villages Send and Send Marsh to the South-West and Ockham to the East have fewer shopping facilities.

== Geography ==
Lying on the main road from London to Portsmouth (from the 1930s referred to as the A3), Ripley was the post town for the whole area (including Woking) from 1813 to 1865. With the coming of the railway to what was then Woking Common in 1838, Ripley's importance diminished, and Woking became its post town in 1865. As motor traffic increased during the 1960s and the 1970s, the Portsmouth Road at Ripley became a notorious bottleneck, relieved by the building of the Ripley bypass in 1976. The A3 was renamed the B2215, and what has always been a major trunk road was expanded into six lanes north of Guildford, bypassing Send and Ripley.

== History ==
The village has existed since Norman times – the chancel of the church of St. Mary Magdalen shows construction of circa 1160 there and supporting feet of fines and ecclesiastical records mention the village at the time. Ripley's sister village of Send to the south-west was the governing parish over the village for over 700 years until 1878 when they became two separate ecclesiastical parishes; they became separate civil parishes in 1933.

== Amenities ==
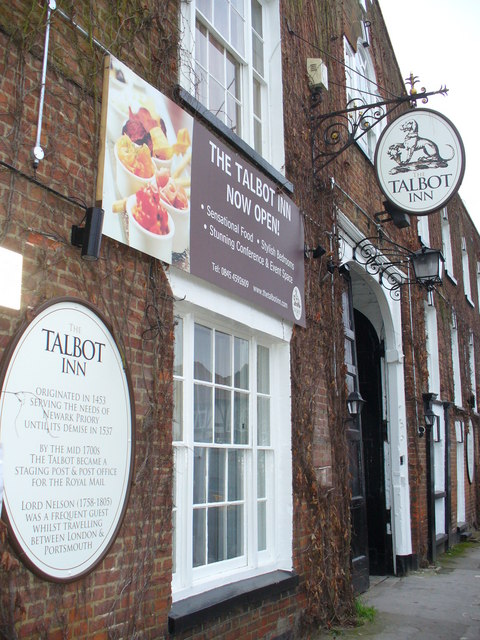
A listed coaching inn, the Talbot Inn

The village includes a coaching inn, the Talbot Inn, which dates back to 1453, as well as The Clockhouse (formerly Drake's) restaurant, which has been awarded a Michelin star and 3 AA rosettes. The Anchor, on Ripley High Street, has 2 AA rosettes and is listed as a Michelin Guide Restaurant. The village high street includes two small supermarkets, cobblers and a bakery. The other pubs in the village are the Jovial Sailor on the western outskirts, The Ship Inn, The Seven Stars and The Half Moon.

Ripley has one private school, Ripley Court Preparatory School. The Ripley Church of England primary school is now shut.

== Ripley Farmers' Market ==
Ripley has a monthly Farmers' Market on the second Saturday of each month, from 9am until 1pm. The market consists of, on average, 45 stalls.

== Notable buildings ==
The village church of St Mary Magdalen has a fine Norman chancel and is a Grade II* listed building.

Among the more than 20 listed buildings and cottages in the village are Pinnocks Café the Ship Inn and Ye Old Sweet Shoppe, J Hartley Antiques, Sage Antiques (Green Cottage), the Clock House and the Old Pharmacy. This last building is a historical place of interest with a Blue Plaque located outside commemorating the production of penicillin for the first time in the UK and possibly the world, for civilian use, by Kenneth White in 1944. Cedar House and Tudor House (one joint property) is another listed building,

== In popular culture ==
Ripley is mentioned in H. G. Wells' novels The War of the Worlds and The Wheels of Chance. The Arthur Conan Doyle Sherlock Holmes short story "The Naval Treaty" includes a setting in Ripley.

== Famous residents ==
Ripley is the birthplace of the rock/blues guitarist Eric Clapton.

Paul Weller is a long-term resident of Ripley and runs local recording studios Black Barn Studios.

== Sport ==
=== Cricket ===
Cricket has been a popular sport in the village for 200 years and is played on the Green.

=== Cycling ===
==== Cycling heritage ====
In the 1870s, cycling also became a popular activity in the South of England and Ripley was a convenient distance from London so that many cyclists would stop there for a break at the Anchor Inn. Sisters Annie and Harriet Dibble encouraged the cyclists so much that, in some years in the following decade, their visitors' book was signed with over 7,000 names.

==== Cycling routes today ====
The 2012 Summer Olympics road races started at The Mall in central London, passed Richmond and extended into Surrey to the south via Hampton Court Palace, Weybridge, Byfleet, West Byfleet, Ripley, West Horsley and Dorking then returned to The Mall via Leatherhead, Oxshott, Hampton Court Palace and Kingston-upon-Thames.

Since then the Surrey 100 sportive and race have come through the village each July.

== Bonfire ==
Since the 1930s a bonfire has been held on the Green to celebrate Guy Fawkes Night. It is a major local event with several thousand attending to see the bonfire, fireworks and funfair.

== Surrounds ==
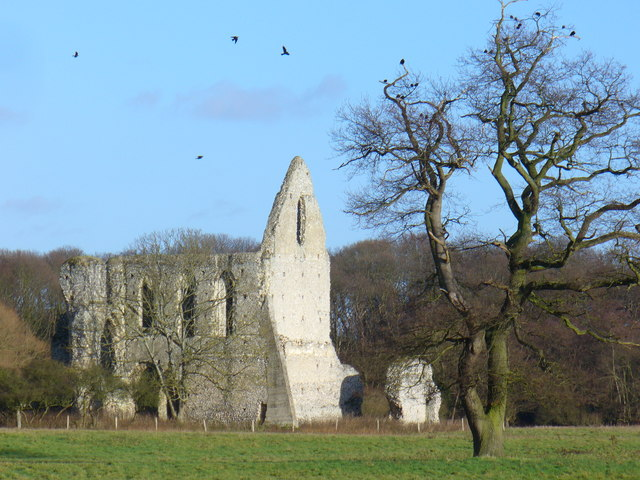
Newark Priory, an Augustinian Abbey less than 1 mile (1.6 km) north of Ripley High Street

Ripley Green is an integral part of the community and can be accessed from Newark Lane and the High Street. There is a village common and small woods which are surrounded by farmland. Walkers can walk along the River Wey from here and see views of Newark Priory.

== Demography and housing ==
2011 Census Homes
Output area	Detached	Semi-detached	Terraced	Flats and apartments	Caravans/temporary/mobile homes	shared between households
(Civil Parish)	270	252	134	68	38	0

The average level of accommodation in the region composed of detached houses was 28%, the average that was apartments was 22.6%.

2011 Census Key Statistics
Output area	Population	Households	% Owned outright	% Owned with a loan	hectares
(Civil Parish)	2,029	762	39.6%	29.9%	927

The proportion of households in the civil parish who owned their home outright compares to the regional average of 35.1%. The proportion who owned their home with a loan compares to the regional average of 32.5%. The remaining % is made up of rented dwellings (plus a negligible % of households living rent-free).

== Published sources ==
McCann, Clare (editor) (2009) 'Memories of War' (Send and Ripley History Society, ISBN 978-0-9562929-0-2)
