= Pyrford =

Village and parish in Surrey, England

Coordinates: 51.3146°N 0.5064°W

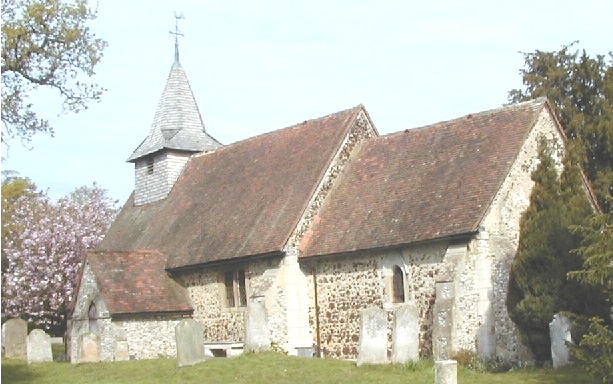
- St Nicholas's Church

- Location within Surrey
- Population: 5,022 (2011 Census. Ward.)
- OS grid reference: TQ041583
- District: Woking
- Shire county: Surrey
- Region: South East
- Country: England
- Sovereign state: United Kingdom
- Post town: Woking
- Postcode district: GU22
- Dialling code: 01932
- Police: Surrey
- Fire: Surrey
- Ambulance: South East Coast
- UK Parliament: Woking

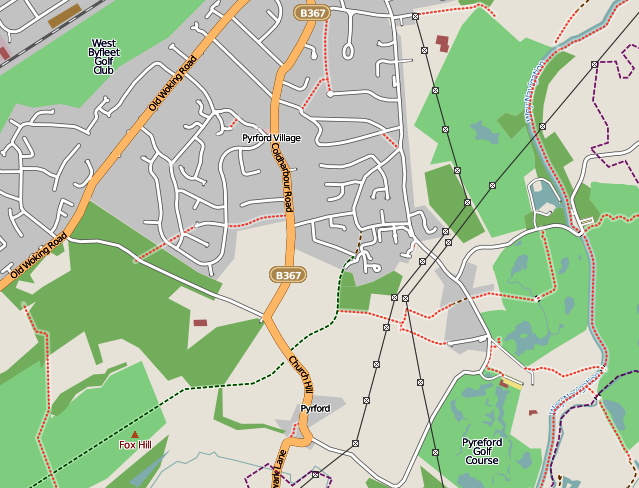
Click to enlarge this map of Pyrford

Pyrford /ˈpɜːrfərd/ is a village in the borough of Woking in Surrey, England. It is on the left bank of the River Wey, around two miles (three kilometres) east of the town of Woking and just south of West Byfleet; the M25 motorway is northeast of the edge of the former parish.

The village sits on raised mixed heath soil, and has historical links with the abbey at Westminster, in whose possession it remained between the Norman conquest in 1066 and the Dissolution of the Monasteries nearly five hundred years later.

== Geography ==
At the foot of slopes in the south of the area are agricultural flood plain pasture meadows bisected by the River Wey Navigation; the actual border is the River Wey itself (though slightly inaccurate as based on meanders as they were before 1820). Roads passing through the village include the B367 (Upshott Lane/Church Hill) and B382 (Old Woking Road). Open areas in the south and east of the village are designated Metropolitan Green Belt.

== History and use in the arts ==
The current village name 'Pyrford' is derived from the Saxon dialect of Old English combined term "Pyrianford", which scholarly research into Old English asserts means 'pear tree ford'.

King James and Anne of Denmark stayed with Sir Francis Wolley at Pyrford on 10 August 1603. Famous residents include the poet John Donne, and Jack Brabham who used to live on Forest Road.

Pyrford is mentioned in The War of the Worlds, by H. G. Wells, in which it is near the landing site of the third of ten Martian invasion cylinders.

The Rowley Bristow Hospital from 1928 to 1992 was in Pyrford in the area now occupied by St Martin's Mews and St Nicholas Crescent.

Early in World War II, due to the risk of enemy air attack, the Vickers Armstrongs aircraft factory at nearby Brooklands had a dispersed facility known as Depot No. W95 in Lower Pyrford Road with two aircraft hangars used for 'aircraft salvage' purposes until at least 1944. Post-war, one of these hangars was occupied by a factory making electrical switches and the other was used as a temporary store for historic aeroplanes by the national Science Museum until Autumn 1958; these premises were finally demolished and redeveloped for new housing in the late 1980s. Pyrford Court was also listed as wartime Depot No. W40 and used for 'aircraft dispersal' - presumably for Vickers Wellington bombers moved there by road before completion and delivery to the Royal Air Force from Brooklands.

Pyrford Court was used as the Thorn's family home in the 1976 film, The Omen, and for the main location of the 1978 film, The Cat and the Canary.

In 1951, the civil parish had a population of 1760. On 1 April 1974, the parish was abolished.

== Leisure ==
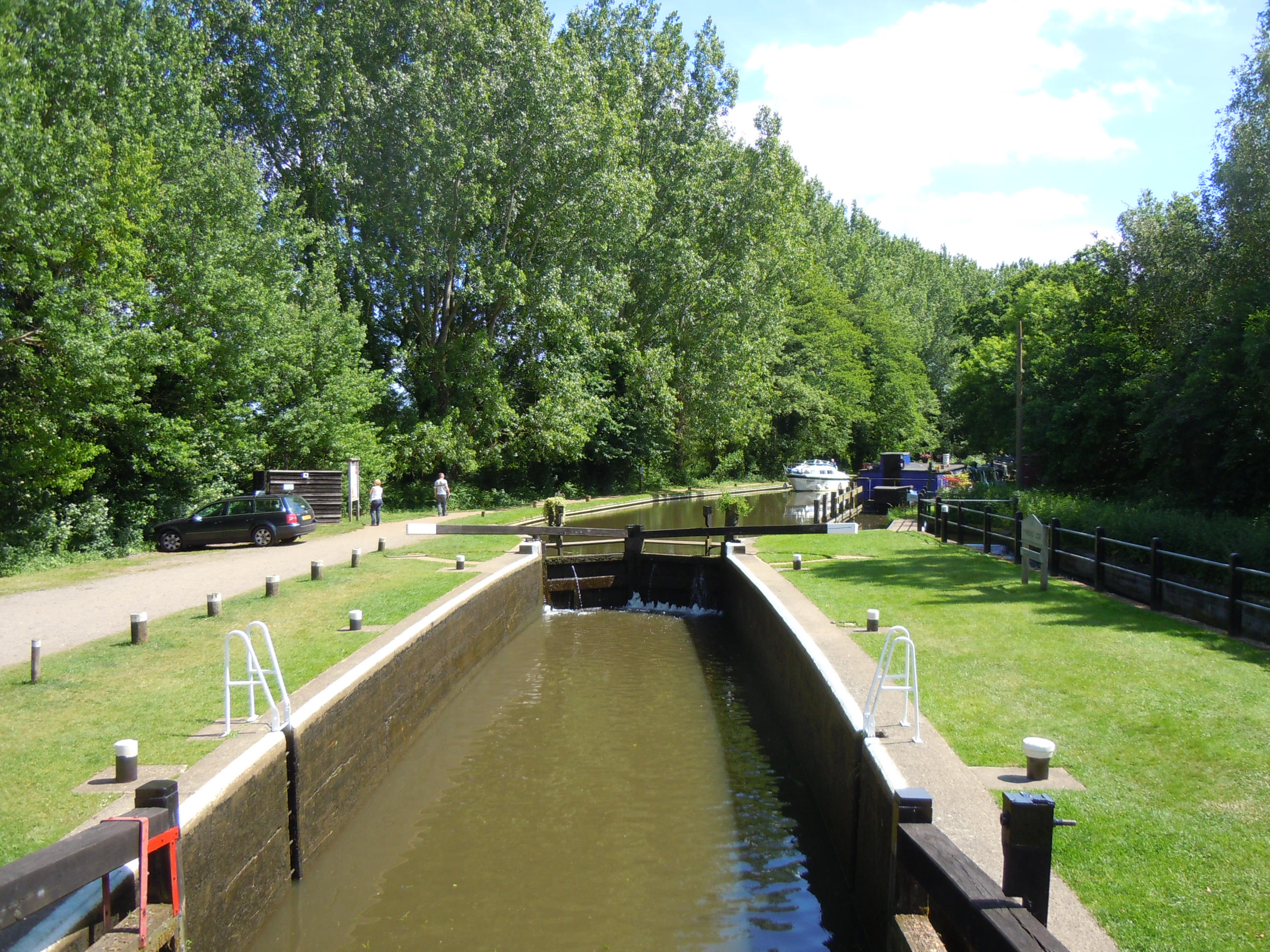
River Wey at Lock Lane

The River Wey Navigation, to the south-east and east of the village, marks the boundary between Pyrford and Wisley. The area has marked trails for ramblers. A public bridleway going east-west, connects the village to the canal, parallel to unpavemented Lock Lane on the far side of the golf course; following this the path connects to three others: one south via the Anchor to Wisley, to the north-east to Byfleet and to the north along the towpath to New Haw, Coxes Lock, Addlestone and a large island at Weybridge which connects with the pavement of Thames Street, in turn connected to the Thames Path. Pyrford marina by the Dodds Bridge footbridge, and with its own access road, on the Pyrford canalside enables people to hire and own boats; it faces the named public house.

July 2012 saw Pyrford's inclusion in what has become the standard version of the London-Surrey cycle classic used in the Summer Olympic Games.

== Amenities ==
The local school is Pyrford Church of England (Aided) Primary School an Academy that is part of The Newark Trust. The school is located on Coldharbour Road and has current Ofsted rating of Outstanding since last inspection in January 2013, with 480 students on roll.

Owing to an old law, and covenants on land controlled by religious sects, Pyrford had no public house, but there are a few such establishments quite close by. The Anchor pub, by Lock Lane, lies on land once part of Wisley parish. The Inn at Maybury is sited alongside the junction of Old Woking Road and Maybury Hill. The third location for drinking is The Yeoman, a Harvester pub-restaurant, on the Old Woking Road in the neighbouring village of West Byfleet. Instead, two social venues in Pyrford are the Pyrford Social Club, a membership club, next to the cricket club and the Twisted Stone golf club situated on Pyrford Road and open to the general public. These are both licensed for alcohol.

== Sports ==
Pyrford has three golf courses: Pyrford Lakes Golf Course, Wisley Golf Course and Twisted Stone. It is also home to Pyrford Cricket Club. Founded in 1858, Pyrford is one of the oldest cricket clubs in Surrey, and has achieved success in recent years. The club has been promoted 10 times in the last 10 years, and achieved an unparalleled treble promotion in 2008, with all three Saturday League sides achieving promotion from their respective divisions of the Surrey Championship. Well known former PCC players include former Zimbabwe captain Tatenda Taibu, New Zealand wicketkeeper Gareth Hopkins and Sky Sports presenter Charles "Got Him" Colvile. Pyrford also has an amateur football club, Pyrford F.C., who play at the Pyrford Cricket ground. Twisted Stone Golf Club on Pyrford Road, offers locals a pay and play service. Membership is not required, and the golf course offers a 9-hole round. A public bridleway crosses the golf course linking Pyrford Road to the Wey Navigation Canal.

=== London 2012 Olympic Games ===
On 28 July (men) and 29 (women), 2012, Pyrford hosted a section of the London 2012 Cycle road race. The race passed through on Coldharbour Road, up onto Upshot Lane and south east on the B367 towards Ripley. Around 8,000 fans lined the route through Pyrford, the focal point being Pyrford Cricket Ground that hosted an Olympics themed fete.

== Transport ==
Hourly bus route 437 links Pyrford with Woking, West Byfleet and Byfleet; with a connection to New Haw and Addlestone. The service is financially supported by Surrey County Council.

== Landmarks ==
=== St. Nicholas Church and Conservation Area ===
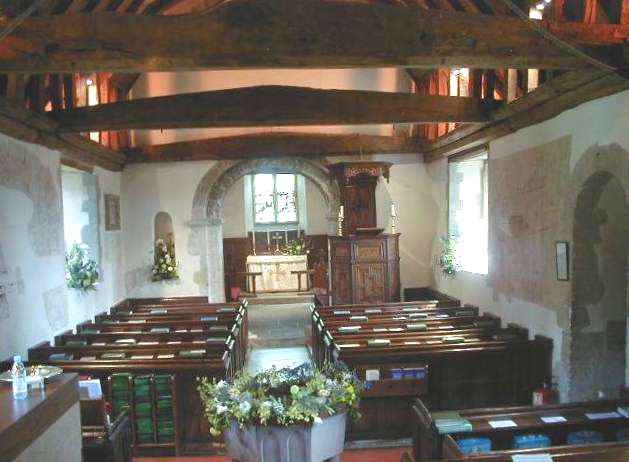
Nave of St Nicholas's Church

The Church of St. Nicholas is less than 1/4 mile (400 metres) north of the ruins of Newark Priory along a medieval lane, and was built around 1140. It is a fine example of a complete Norman church and is one of the significant minority of medieval churches in the United Kingdom in the top category of listed buildings.

It is thought possible that Queen Elizabeth I might have worshipped at St Nicholas's Church. She reputedly donated a silver chalice to the church in 1570. Original frescoes, painted in red ochre, were uncovered during renovations in 1869 and 1967. There are two sets of drawings from different periods with subjects including scenes from Christ's Passion, and an illustration of pilgrims preparing to set sail in a pilgrimage to Spain.

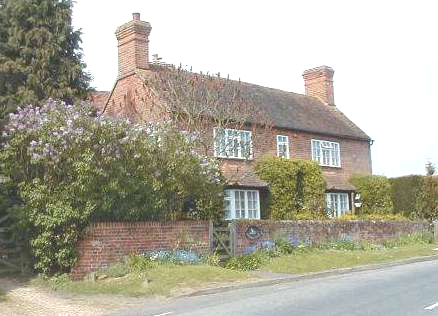
Cottage in the conservation area.

The church grounds and the surrounding lands are designated a conservation area, having special architectural and historical importance.

== Rowley Bristow Hospital ==
Rowley Bristow Hospital, an orthopaedic hospital in Pyrford, was founded in 1928.

It was formed from St Martin's home for crippled boys and the St Nicholas Hospital Home. Originally named St Nicholas' and St Martin's Orthopaedic Hospital Homes and Special School of Recovery, it was renamed in 1948 as the Rowley Bristow Orthopedic Hospital after a well known orthopaedic surgeon, and surgical director of St Nicholas, Rowley Bristow.

At its prime it was considered a centre of excellence, but declined from a peak of 250 beds in 1948 to just 41 shortly before it closed in 1992.

The orthopaedic department at St Peter's Hospital, Chertsey is now named the Rowley Bristow Orthopedic Unit.

== Notable people ==
- Lorne Welch, Colditz prisoner
- Felix Aylmer, actor
- John Donne, poet

== See also ==
- List of places of worship in Woking (borough)
