= Loseley Park =

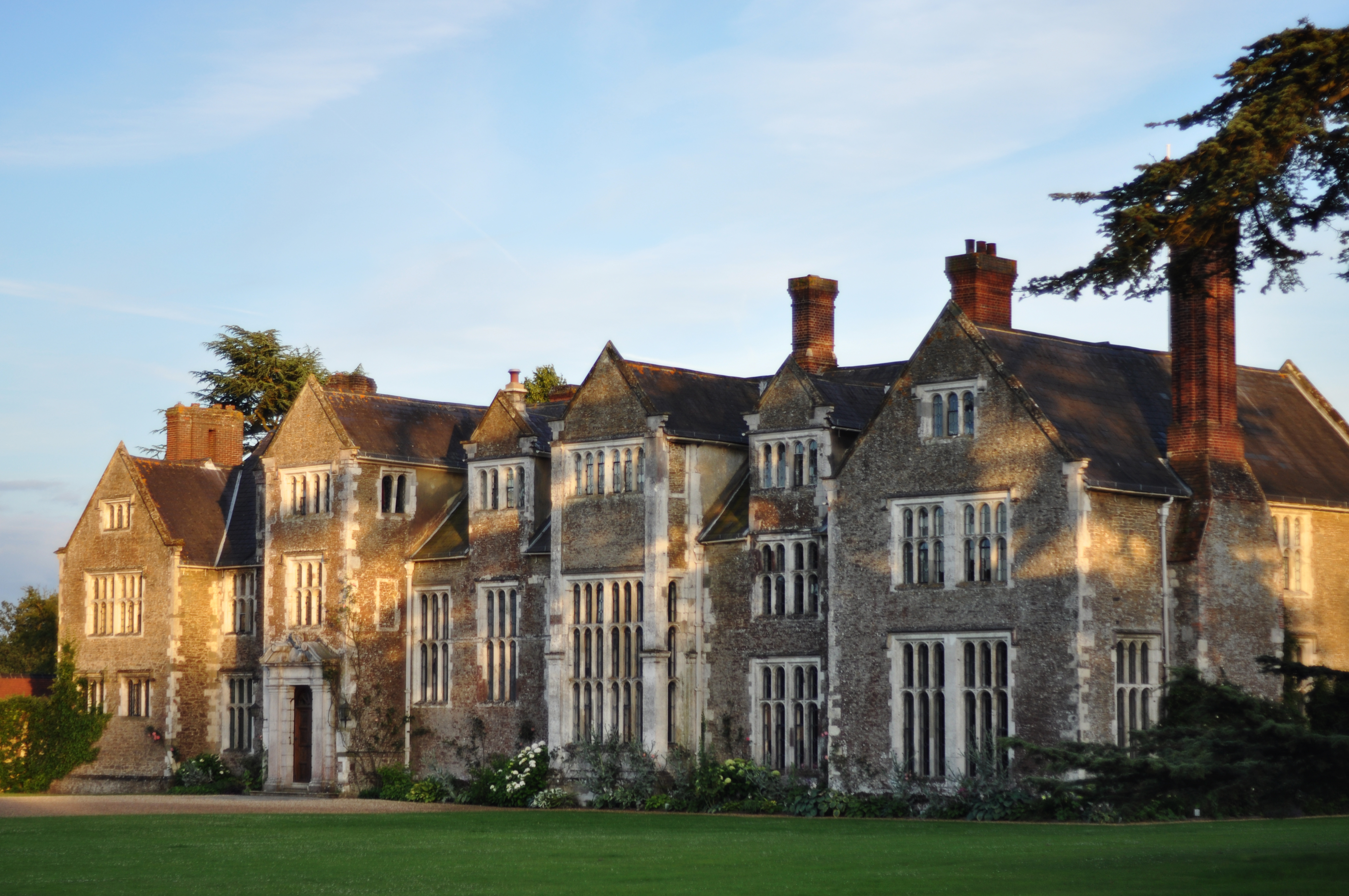

- Location within Surrey
- 51°12′55″N 0°36′18″W
- Type: Manor house
- Location: Littleton Lane, Artington, Surrey, England
- OS grid reference: SU 97495 47149

History
- Built: 1568

Site notes
- Architectural style: Tudor
- Owner: More-Molyneux family

Listed Building – Grade I
- Official name: Loseley House
- Designated: 18 February 1958
- Reference no.: 1029573

Loseley Park is a large Tudor manor house with later additions and modifications 3 miles (4.8 km) south-west of Guildford, Surrey, England, in Artington close to the hamlet of Littleton. The estate was acquired by the direct ancestors of the current owners, the More-Molyneux family, at the beginning of the 16th century. The house built for Sir William More is a Grade I listed building, the highest rank in architecture or heritage. Loseley appears in the Domesday Book of 1086 as Losele. It was held by Turald (Thorold) from Roger de Montgomery. Its Domesday assets were: 2 hides. It had 4 ploughs, 5 acres (20,000 m^{2}) of meadow. It rendered £3. The papers of Sir Thomas Cawarden, Master of the Revels, were formerly preserved in the house. Loseley Park is still the residence of the More-Molyneux family and is open to the public. The 17th-century tithe barn is available for weddings.

== The house ==
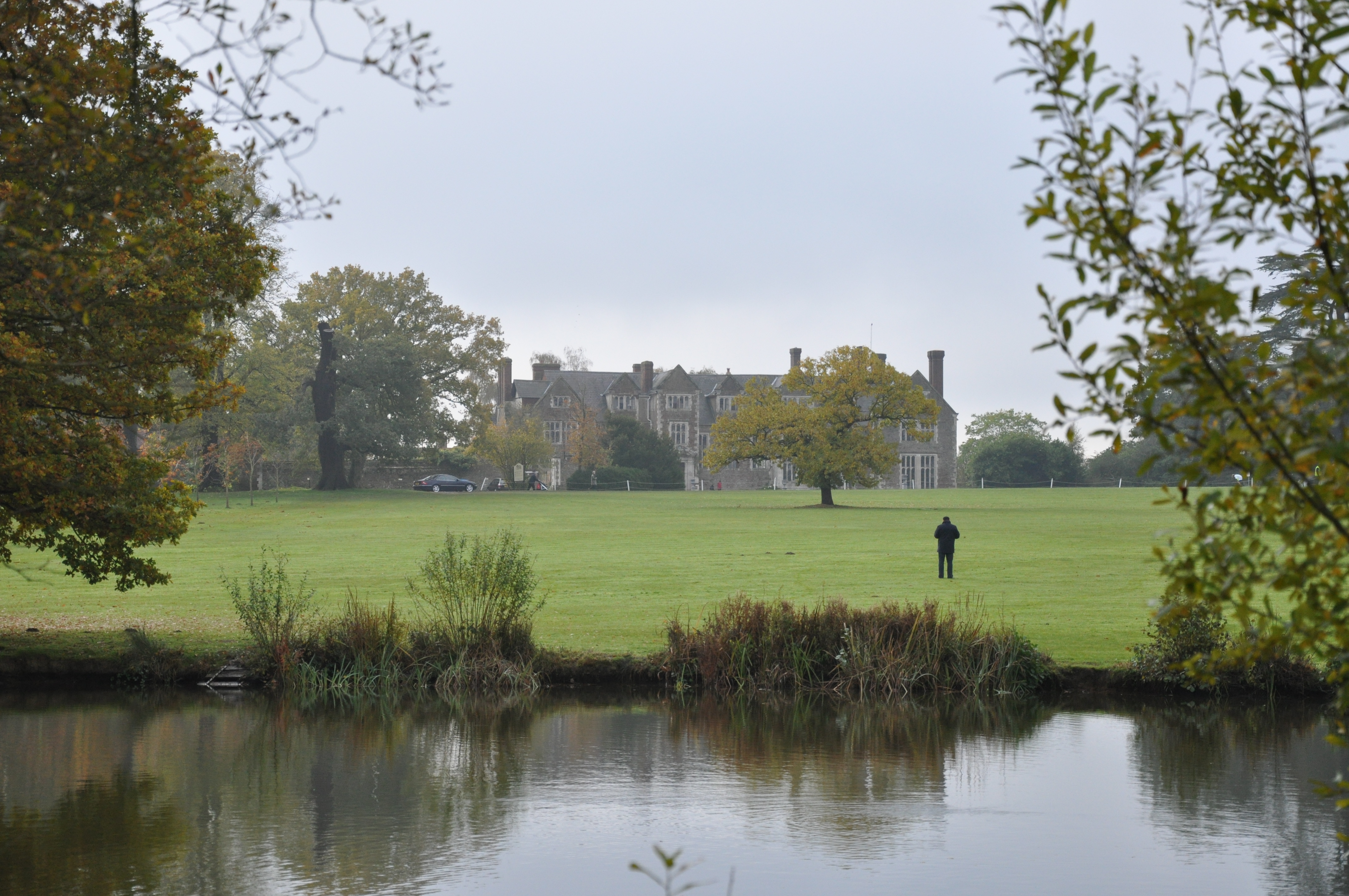
Loseley Park

The present house was built between 1562 and 1568 with stone brought from the ruins of Waverley Abbey. The new house replaced a smaller one which Elizabeth I declared was not 'adequate' for her to visit and requested something larger be built. The great hall is the principal room containing panelling from Henry VIII's Nonsuch Palace, a minstrel's gallery, carvings by Grinling Gibbons, panels from Henry VIII's banqueting tents and a collection of royal and family portraits.

The drawing room has a gilded ceiling that was commissioned for James I's visit and a massive chalk fireplace designed by Hans Holbein. The carvings above the library fireplace (dated 1570) commemorate one of Elizabeth I's visits. Sir William More's room contain an 18th-century Vauxhall mirror. Two bedrooms named the King's Room and the Queen's Room were used by James I and Elizabeth I respectively. The house contains one of the few paintings of Anne Boleyn.

== The garden ==
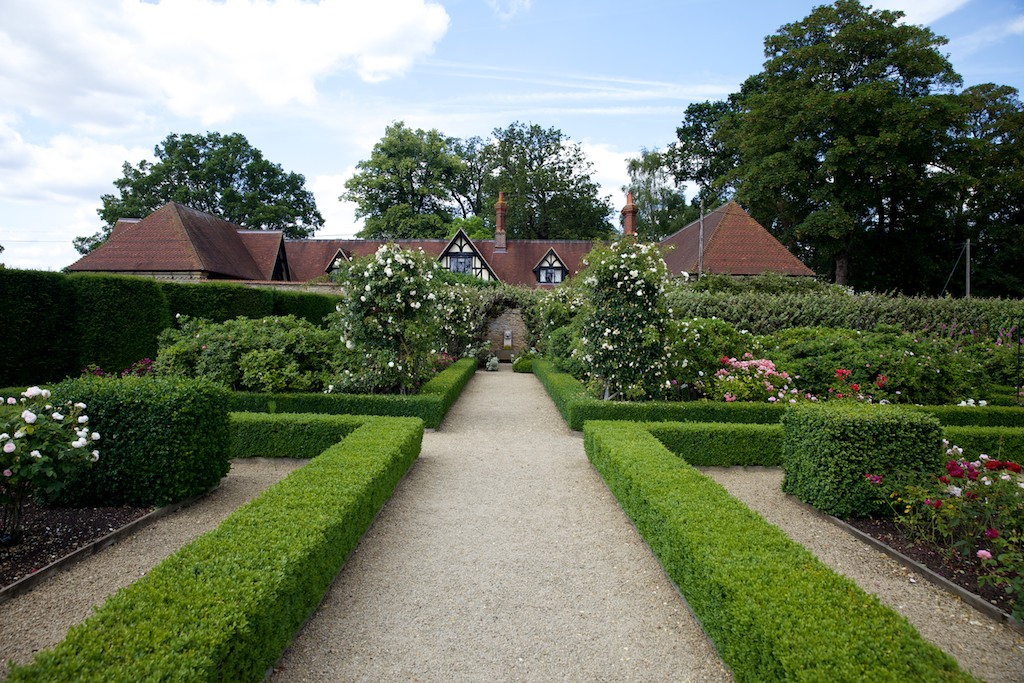
Rose garden

The walled garden, based on a design by Gertrude Jekyll, contains a series of "rooms" with different themes running through them. The redevelopment of the garden commenced in 1993/4 with the Rose Garden and continued with the Herb Garden, Flower Garden, White Garden and, most recently, the organic Vegetable and Cut Flower Garden. The gardens are surrounded by an old wall of similar age to the house and contain a vine walk, a huge spread of wisteria, the moat and moat walk, and the old mulberry tree around which a family prophecy revolves.

== Film and television ==
Loseley Park and house has been used as a filming location for several productions. One of the earliest was The Counterfeit Plan (1957), and others include A Dandy in Aspic (1968), The Legacy (1978), Midsomer Murders (1997 TV series), Sense and Sensibility (2008 miniseries), Emma (2009 miniseries) and The Special Relationship (2010). In 2016, the house was featured in the Netflix series The Crown. The films The Favourite and Rebecca were both partly shot here. In 2020, the television series Belgravia filmed some scenes here.

The garden was featured in BBC's Gardeners' World in 2026.
