= List of places of worship in the Borough of Guildford =

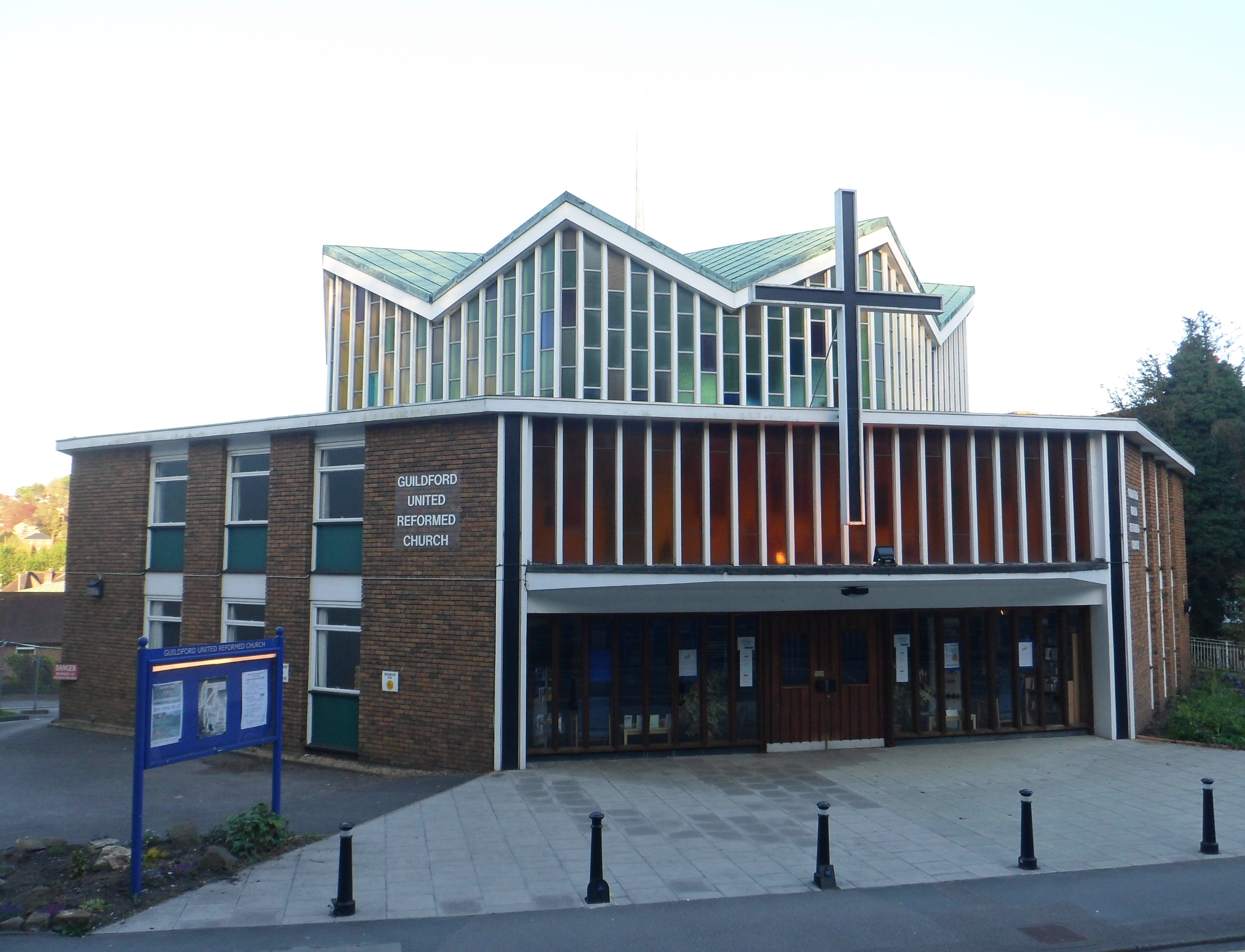
The borough of Guildford, centred on the town of that name, has many churches ancient and modern. An example of the latter is Guildford United Reformed Church, which dates from 1965.

The Borough of Guildford has more than 100 current and former places of worship. Of those standing, 83 are in use by various Christian denominations and (in the case of Guildford Synagogue) Jews, and 20 have been converted to secular uses. Guildford is one of 11 local government districts in the English county of Surrey, which is immediately south of London and features the Surrey Hills National Landscape, market towns, ancient villages, green spaces and 20th-century suburbs. The ancient town of Guildford, which gives the borough its name, is also the county town.

The 2011 census shows that the majority of residents are Christian. The Church of England, the country's Established Church, has the most churches. The Catholic Church, Methodists, Baptists and the United Reformed Church have congregations, some of which share buildings with other denominations. Quakers have convened in Guildford since the 17th century; the Congregational movement had a large following in the area; and the Plymouth Brethren Christian Church have meeting places around Guildford town.

English Heritage has awarded listed status to 38 current and four former places of worship in the district. A building is defined as "listed" when it is placed on a statutory register of buildings of "special architectural or historic interest" in accordance with the Planning (Listed Buildings and Conservation Areas) Act 1990. The Department for Culture, Media and Sport, a Government department, is responsible for this; English Heritage, a non-departmental public body, acts as an agency of the department to administer the process and advise the department on relevant issues. There are three grades of listing status. Grade I, the highest, is defined as being of "exceptional interest"; Grade II* is used for "particularly important buildings of more than special interest"; and Grade II, the lowest, is used for buildings of "special interest". As of February 2001, there were 30 Grade I-listed buildings, 40 with Grade II* status and 975 Grade II-listed buildings in Guildford borough.

== Overview of the borough and its places of worship ==
Guildford borough is in the west of Surrey.

Guildford is the second largest local government district in the county of Surrey and the most populous: there were approximately 134,400 residents in 2007 and 137,183 at the time of the United Kingdom Census 2011. Clockwise from the northwest, it has boundaries with the boroughs and districts of Surrey Heath, Woking, Elmbridge, Mole Valley and Waverley in Surrey and the borough of Rushmoor in Hampshire. The borough covers about 104 square miles (270 km^{2}) of land in the centre and west of the county. The market town of Guildford accounts for about half the population, and there is one other large urban centre: the towns of Ash and Tongham and their surrounding estates have about 18,000 residents. The rest of the borough is largely rural, characterised by Areas of Outstanding Natural Beauty associated with the North Downs interspersed with ancient, affluent villages.

The present borough of Guildford is dominated by the town of Guildford itself. The ancient county town of Surrey is situated at the point where the River Wey cuts through the North Downs. Several transport routes also converge at this point, such as the Harrow Way (an ancient trackway), the old London–Portsmouth Road and various railway lines. The town has been important for centuries. It was an ancient borough, the site of a Dominican friary (demolished) and a castle (extant), and a royal charter and a market were first recorded in the 13th century. Alongside these, there were three ancient parish churches—all of which survive. St Mary's retains its 11th-century tower and was extended in the 12th and 13th centuries. Holy Trinity and St Nicholas' have both been rebuilt but still have some 13th-century features. The latter also has a private chapel, the Loseley Chapel, commemorating occupants of the nearby Loseley Park manor house. The town expanded over time, especially from the 19th century when the railways arrived, and the neighbouring village of Stoke (with its 14th-century church, St John the Evangelist's) became part of the urban area. Particularly in the Victorian era, many more Anglican churches were provided as the population grew: Christ Church (1868), St Saviour (1899), Emmanuel (1904), and one each in the suburban villages of Burpham (St Luke's, 1859) and Merrow (St John the Evangelist's, a 12th-century church completely rebuilt in 1842). (Note: Tin tabernacles which served as chapels of ease to Holy Trinity and St Nicholas' existed by 1911 in the Addison Road and Guildford Park areas respectively, but no longer survive.) As Guildford grew still further in the 20th century, churches were opened in the Onslow Village, Westborough and Wood Street Village areas and on the Park Barn and Bellfields housing estates. A second church in Burpham was one of several inexpensive buildings designed for Anglican congregations in Surrey by David Evelyn Nye in the 1960s. "Bright, cheerful and well suited to modern needs", they were operationally flexible and architecturally distinctive. Within the borough, the churches at Wood Street and Bellfields were also designed by Nye.

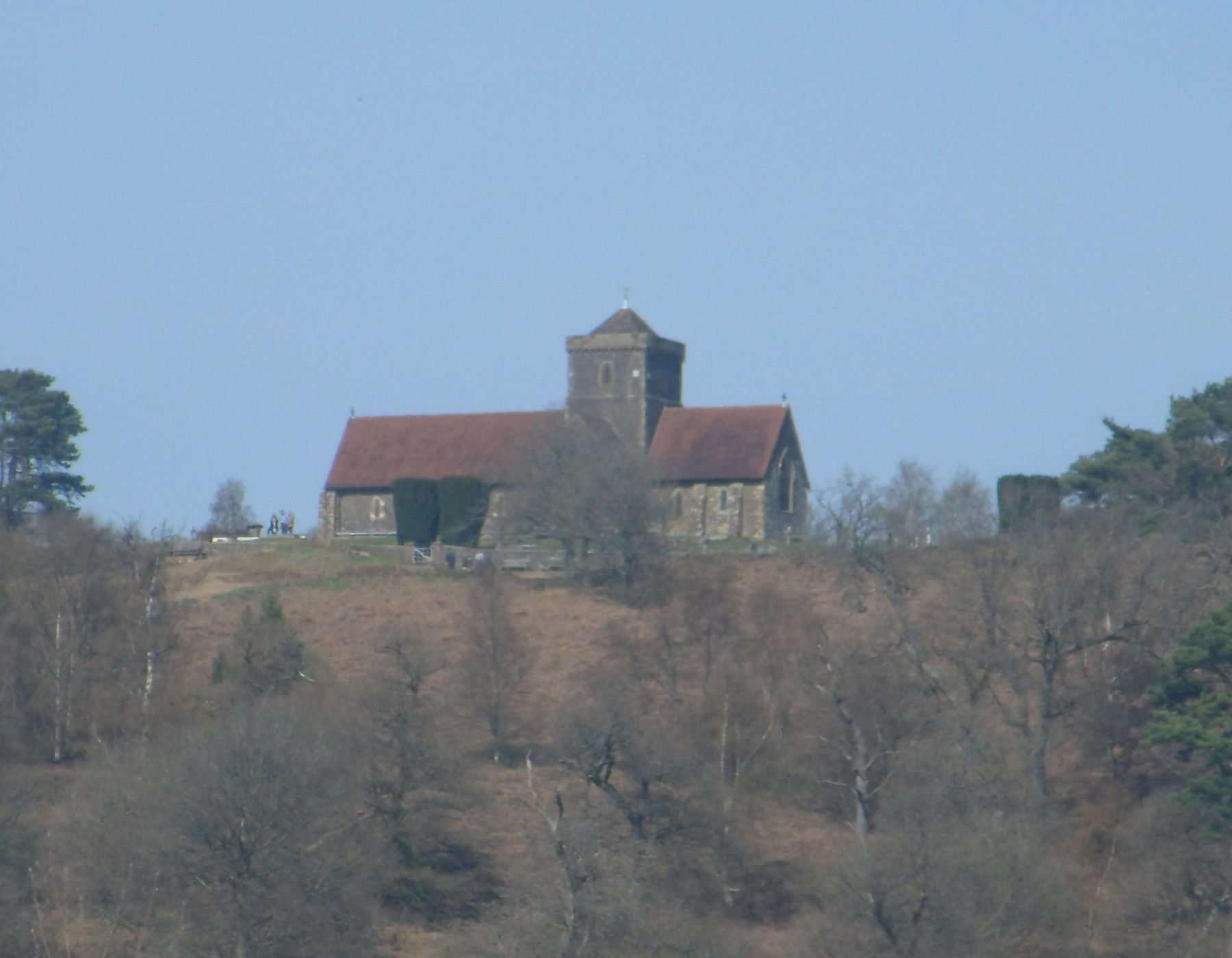
Ancient rural churches include the 12th-century St Martha-on-the-Hill, seen here from the lower ground of Albury.

Guildford town is surrounded by ancient villages, both in the countryside and on the main road and rail routes into it. Although ribbon development has turned some into low-density suburbs, many retain their centuries-old parish churches. For example, East and West Horsley and East and West Clandon form "a suburban chain from Guildford to Leatherhead", but the Clandons have well-preserved Norman and 13th-century churches, and the Horsleys' churches have a Saxon tower and 11th- and 12th-century fabric respectively. Southeast of here, but more isolated and very popular with tourists, the cluster of villages around the River Tillingbourne at the west end of the Vale of Holmesdale supports a range of Anglican churches. The landmark St Martha's Church, a ruined 12th-century church rebuilt in 1848, stands on St Martha's Hill north of Chilworth. St James's Church at Shere, "second to none in Surrey for beauty and antiquarian interest", is principally 11th- and 12th-century, and Albury's original parish church in Albury Park may predate the Norman conquest of England. The centre of population moved, though, and a new church was built in 1842. Holmbury St Mary and Peaslake both have 19th-century churches as well: formerly chapels of ease to Shere, the architecturally impressive buildings date from 1879 and 1889 respectively. Nearby, a 19th-century barn in the even more isolated hamlet of Farley Green was converted into a church after being presented to the parish of Albury. Elsewhere in the borough, medieval churches (restored to various degrees in the Victorian era) survive in the villages of Compton, Effingham, Ockham, Pirbright, Puttenham, Ripley, Seale, Send, Shalford, Wanborough, Wisley and Worplesdon. Ash and Tongham, now part of the Blackwater Valley conurbation, also retain their old parish churches.

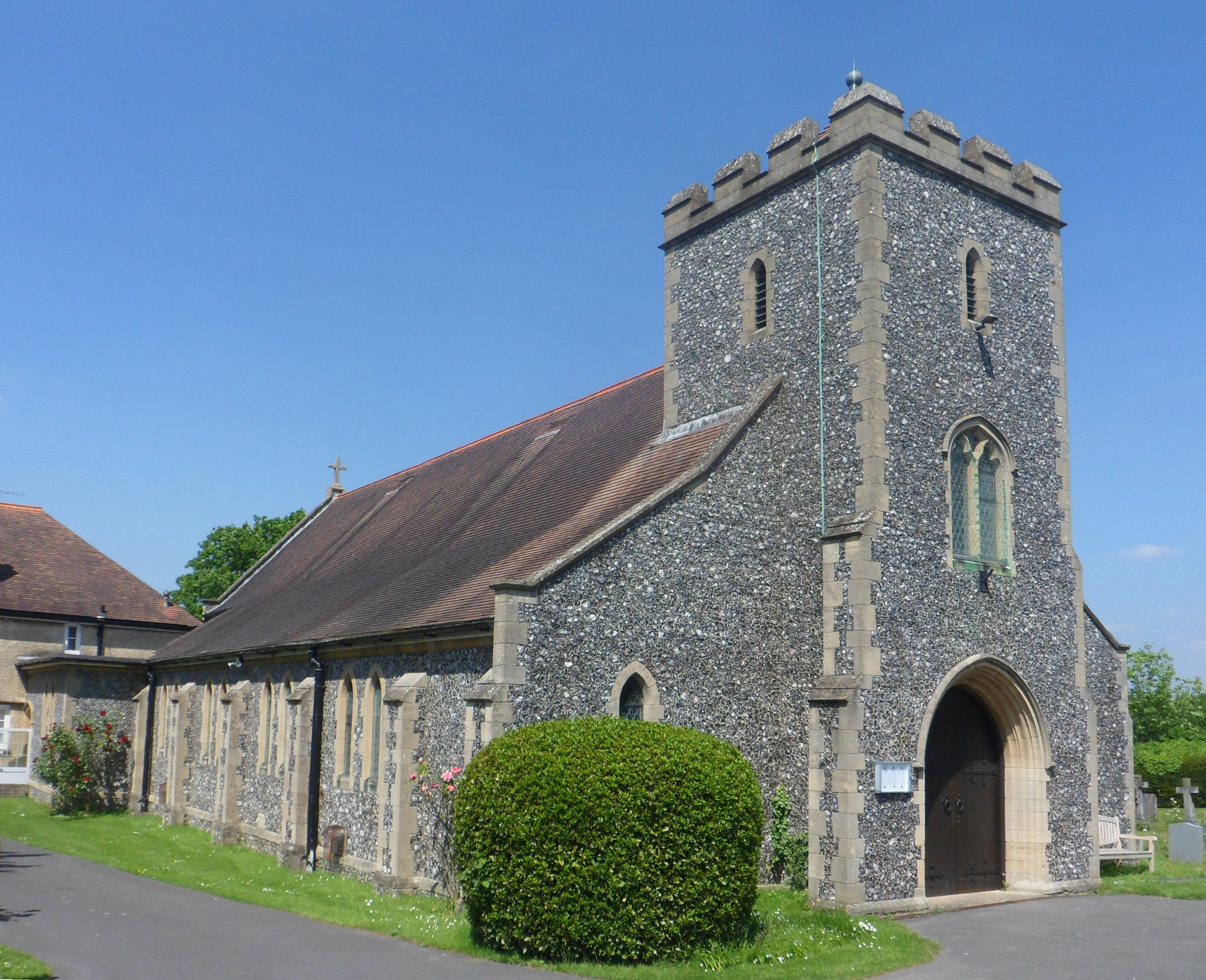
Ian Nairn said Effingham's Roman Catholic church "looks more medieval than the [Anglican] parish church", but it dates from 1913.

Roman Catholic worship was outlawed for many years until the end of the 18th century, although some owners of country estates covertly kept the faith. The Guildford Catholic Mission began in 1857 when the priest from St Edward's Church, Sutton Park (Note: This is in the grounds of Sutton Place, home of the Catholic Weston family. It is over the border in the adjacent Borough of Woking.) began to celebrate Mass above a shop. In 1860 St Joseph's Church was built; it was replaced by a larger church on a different site in 1984. The west of Guildford is served by St Mary's Catholic Church, which dates from 1964 but whose origins lie in a Mass centre opened at Rydes Hill Preparatory School, a Catholic private school. The suburbs of Burpham and Merrow gained Catholic churches of their own in 1960 and 1973 respectively, although Burpham's closed in 2003 and St Pius X's Church at Merrow now serves both areas. The Church of the Holy Angels (1934) serves the Ash area, and the "nicely composed and well detailed" Church of Our Lady of Sorrows opened in Effingham in 1913. A small church served Catholics in the Gomshall area from the 1960s until 2007, although it remains in religious use as a Coptic Orthodox church. Most of the money was raised locally—especially by means of regular bingo games in nearby Shere, resulting in its nickname of "Bingo Chapel".

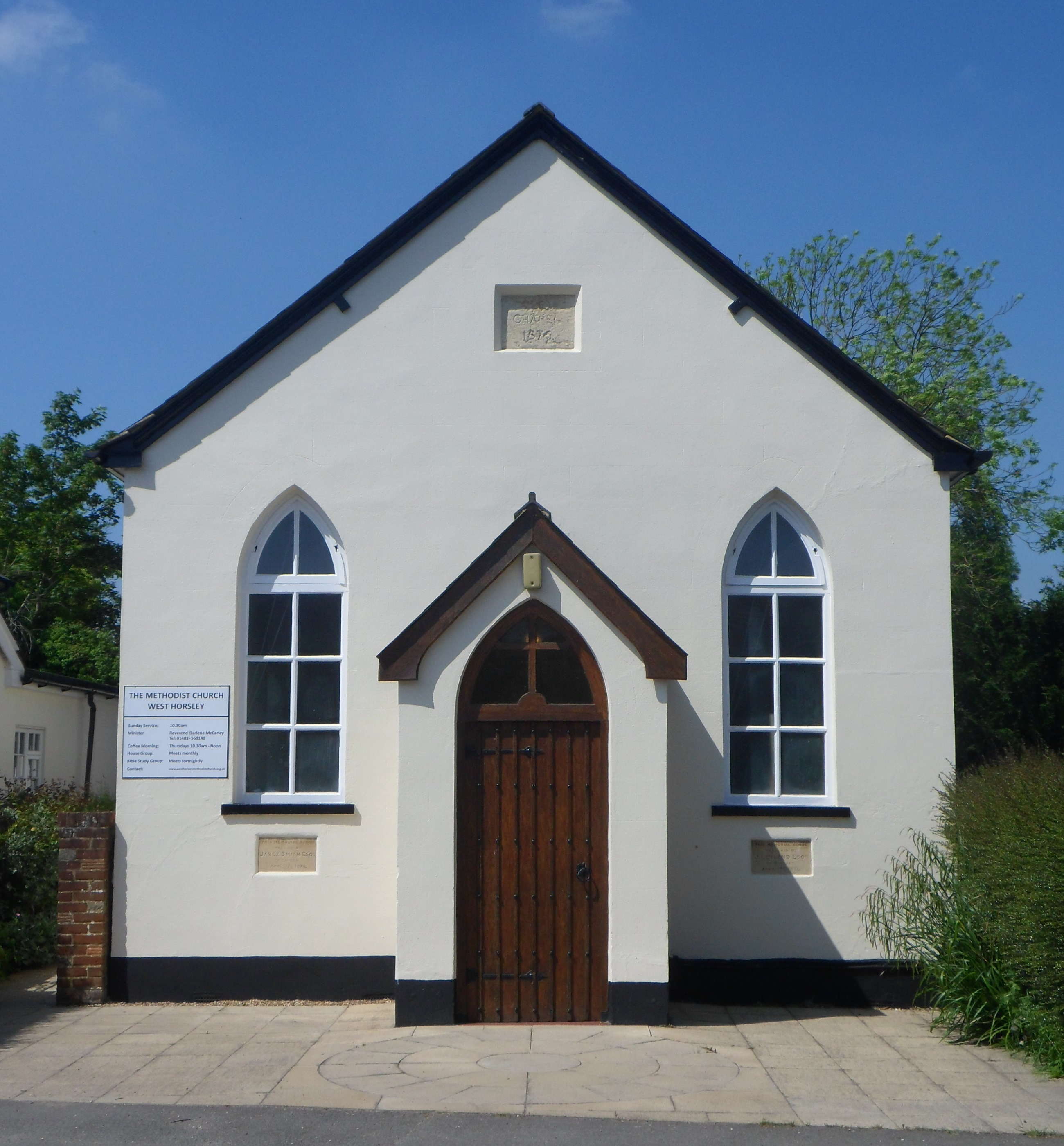
West Horsley Methodist Church is one of many 19th-century Nonconformist chapels in the borough.

Protestant Nonconformism was strong in the area in the 19th century, and many chapels associated with Nonconformist denominations survive—although not all remain in religious use. An Independent chapel was built in 1802 in the centre of Guildford; it later became associated with the Congregational movement, and after a large new Congregational church opened in 1863 it became a Sunday school before being converted into a restaurant. Guildford Congregational Church on North Street was demolished and replaced by the present United Reformed Church (Note: The United Reformed Church denomination was formed from the amalgamation of the Congregational Church and the Presbyterian Church of England in 1972.) building nearby in 1965. A Congregational chapel was founded in Gomshall in 1825 and is still used by the United Reformed Church. Elsewhere, there were Congregational chapels or mission halls at Compton (1876), Normandy (Willey Green) (1825), Holmbury St Mary (Felday Chapel; 1825), Pirbright (1868) and Rydes Hill (1862). All have closed, but the 1822 chapel at Worplesdon remains in use as a United Reformed Church and in 1985 the former telephone exchange at Normandy was converted into a chapel to replace the building at Willey Green. Westborough and Bellfields in Guildford also have United Reformed congregations, the latter as part of St Peter's Shared Church which is also used by Anglicans.

Baptists established fewer churches but can trace their local origins back further. Charcoal Barn Chapel at Tunsgate, now demolished, is the parent of four congregations in Guildford town. The present Grace Church Guildford met at the old chapel (converted from a barn in the 1680s) until 1953, when it moved to Chertsey Street, and is its direct successor. Next came Guildford Baptist Church—founded in 1837 and now occupying its third building, the Millmead Centre; then Bethel Strict Baptist Chapel, founded in 1879 by Calvinist seceders; and in 1992, Guildford Park Church—a declining Evangelical church reinvigorated by a church plant from Chertsey Street. The Chertsey Street and Guildford Park churches reunited in 2018 under the Grace Church Guildford identity. Elsewhere, the Grade II-listed Ebenezer Strict Baptist Chapel at Ripley has been open since 1812, and a newly established group (New Life Baptist Church) owns a combined church and community centre in Stoughton.

Methodist chapels were built in several villages in the 19th century, and the Methodist Statistical Returns published in 1947 (Note: The statistical return was compiled between 1940 and 1947 with the aim of documenting all Methodist chapels extant at that time: their location, previous affiliation prior to the Methodist Union of 1932, capacity, building materials and similar details.) recorded the existence of nine chapels of Wesleyan origin in the present-day borough, along with a single Primitive Methodist church on Chertsey Street in central Guildford. As well as ex-Wesleyan chapels in central Guildford (North Street) and the suburb of Stoughton, the villages of Ash, Ash Vale, Effingham, Normandy, Ripley, Shalford and West Horsley had one each. Effingham and West Horsley are still open, and a new Methodist church was built in 1955 to serve a new housing estate in Merrow, but the others have closed; the buildings in Ash Vale, Ripley and Shalford survive in alternative uses. A second Primitive Methodist chapel was extant in 1914, but had fallen out of use by the time the Statistical Returns were compiled. Guildford town centre's old Wesleyan chapel stood alongside its Congregational equivalent on North Street until the 1960s, when both were demolished; a new Methodist church was built, but in 2013 the congregation moved out and started worshipping at St Mary's Church as part of a formal partnership between the Anglican and Methodist Churches. The chapel at Chertsey Street was sold to Baptists in 1953.

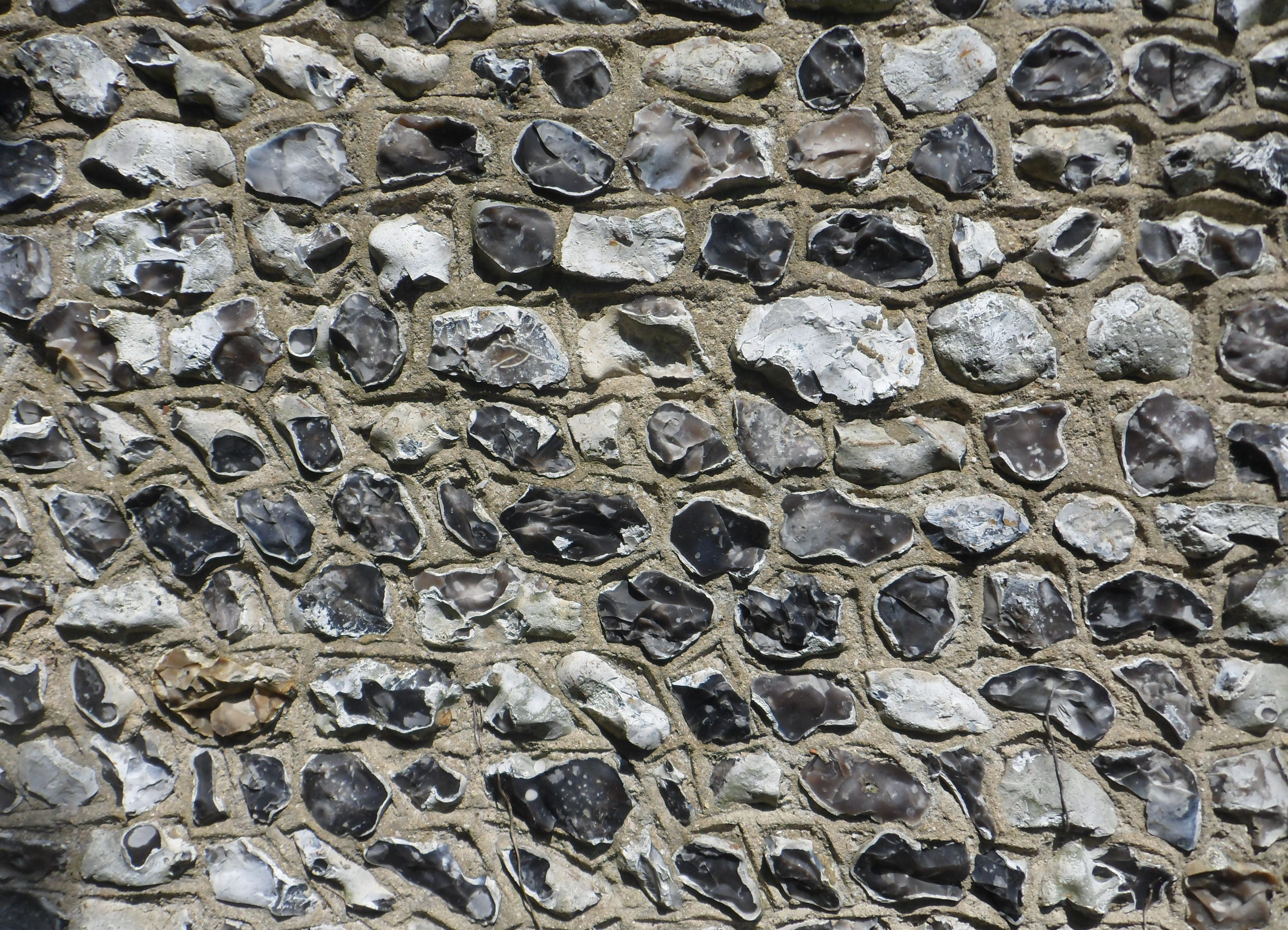
Locally, flint was the commonest building material for ancient churches (chancel wall of St Martin's Church, East Horsley pictured).

Building materials for churches vary across the borough. Good quality stone has never been plentiful in Surrey, but the area around Guildford yielded sarsens and puddingstone: these were sometimes used in the construction of churches, as at Worplesdon and Ripley respectively. Bargate stone was quarried on a small scale around Guildford town and Godalming, and it was used to build churches at Burpham, Compton, Normandy, Chilworth (St Martha-on-the-Hill), and Shackleford, as well as St Nicolas Church, Guildford and the tower at St Lawrence's Church, Seale. "Irregular veins" of carrstone also occur locally in the Lower Greensand, and it can be seen (albeit obscured by rendering) at Wisley church. The "curious local building practice" of galleting—placing pieces of carrstone or flint into the mortar surrounding blocks of masonry—is in evidence at Pirbright. Most common, though, was the use of flint. The prevalence of this hard stone around the North Downs made it "the obvious material to use" for medieval churchbuilders in Surrey. Flints were often laid roughly and were rarely knapped, so Surrey's flint churches lack the elegance of those in other counties. Nonconformist chapels in the area are mostly brick-built with tiled roofs, in common with the rest of Surrey; although stone was sometimes used from the late 19th century, as at Ward Street Chapel in Guildford. David Evelyn Nye's 1960s churches used laminated wood extensively.

Some of Guildford's religious buildings do not fit these general patterns. At Chilworth is a 1950s timber church. A tin tabernacle survives in use at nearby Peasmarsh in Shalford parish, and back in Chilworth another (now the village hall) served as the original Anglican church. It was replaced by the former Greshambury Institute, an Arts and Crafts-style building used by workers at a printing firm. Two 19th-century barns in the borough have also been converted into churches: at Farley Green in 1930, and in East Horsley 25 years later. Another conversion of a secular building took place in 1985, when the congregation of the Normandy United Reformed Church bought the village's redundant telephone exchange to replace their small chapel.

== Religious affiliation ==
According to the United Kingdom Census 2011, 137,183 people lived in the borough of Guildford. Of these, 60.23% identified themselves as Christian, 1.98% were Muslim, 0.95% were Hindu, 0.61% were Buddhist, 0.23% were Jewish, 0.15% were Sikh, 0.34% followed another religion, 27.78% claimed no religious affiliation and 7.73% did not state their religion. The proportions of Christians, Buddhists and people with no religious affiliation were higher than the respective percentages across England as a whole (59.38%, 0.45% and 24.74%). Hinduism, Judaism, Islam, Sikhism and other religions all had lower proportions of adherents.

== Administration ==
=== Anglican churches ===
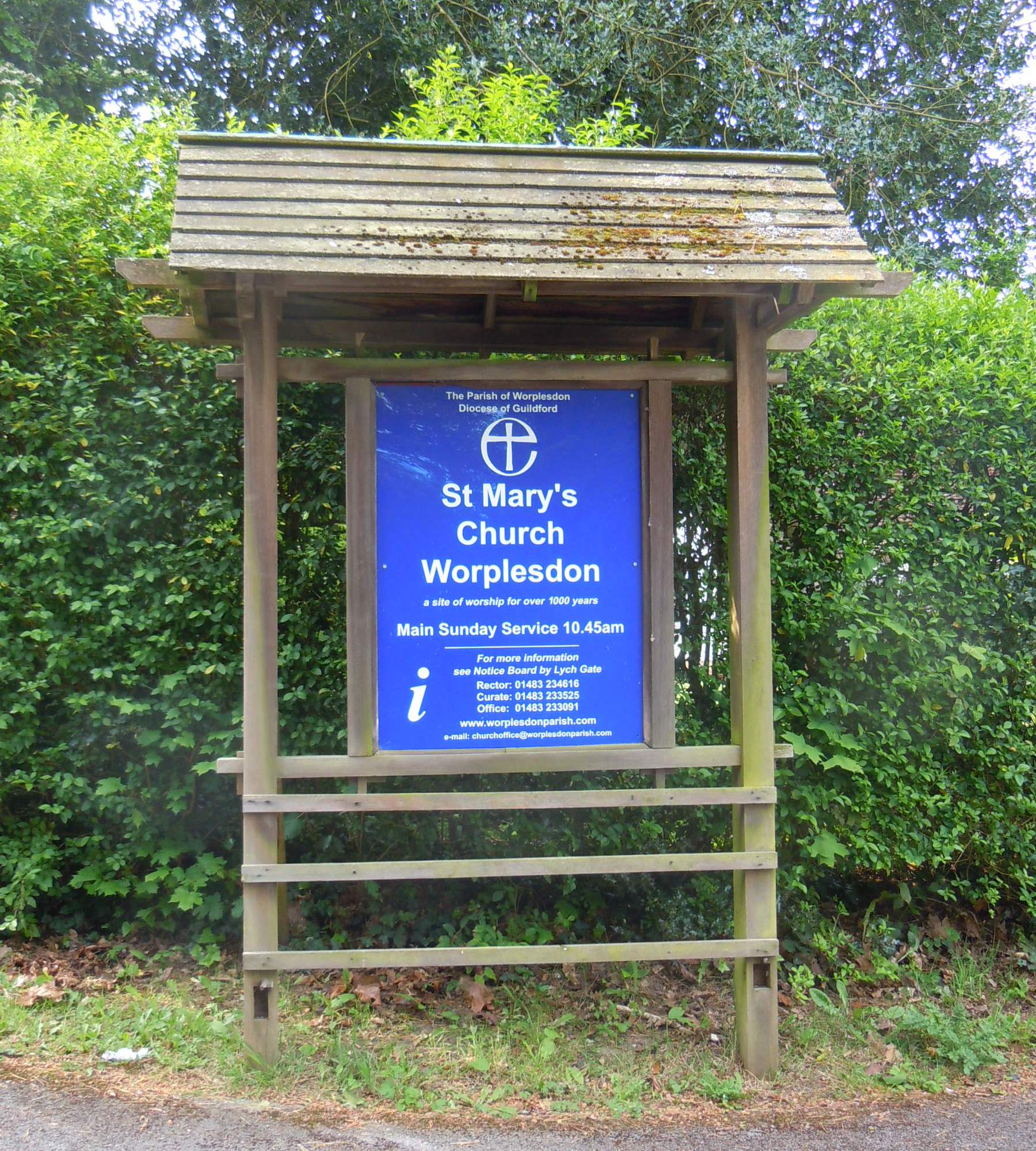
All Anglican churches in the area are part of the Diocese of Guildford, as shown on the noticeboard at St Mary the Virgin's Church, Worplesdon.

The Diocese of Guildford administers all of the borough's Anglican churches. Its seat is Guildford Cathedral. The 46 churches are grouped geographically into deaneries. The two Archdeaconries of Dorking and Surrey are an intermediate administrative level between the diocese and the deaneries: Dorking, Leatherhead and Woking deaneries are part of the Archdeaconry of Dorking and Aldershot, Cranleigh, Godalming and Guildford deaneries are in the Archdeaconry of Surrey. Dorking Deanery is responsible for Holmbury St Mary's church. East Horsley, Effingham, Ockham and the two churches at West Horsley are covered by Leatherhead Deanery. Pirbright, Ripley, Send and Wisley come under Woking Deanery's control. The churches at Ash, Ash Vale and Tongham are in Aldershot Deanery. Cranleigh Deanery covers Albury, Chilworth, Farley Green, Peaslake and Shere. The churches at Compton, Puttenham, Seale, Shackleford, The Sands and Wanborough are part of Godalming Deanery. Guildford Deanery covers the borough's other churches: the village churches of East Clandon, Normandy, Peasmarsh, St Martha, Shalford, West Clandon and Worplesdon; those in Guildford's suburbs and housing estates (Bellfields, Onslow Village, Park Barn, Wood Street Village, Merrow, Stoughton, Westborough and the two in Burpham); and the town-centre churches of Christ Church, Holy Trinity, St John the Evangelist's, St Mary's, St Nicholas' and St Saviour's.

=== Roman Catholic churches ===
Guildford borough has five Roman Catholic churches —in the Merrow and Rydes Hill areas of Guildford and in the town centre, at Ash and at Effingham. In addition, there is the Roman Catholic Benedictine monastery of St Augustine's Abbey, Chilworth. Effingham is administered by Epsom Deanery and the others come under Guildford Deanery; these are two of 13 deaneries in the Roman Catholic Diocese of Arundel and Brighton, whose cathedral is at Arundel in West Sussex.

=== Other denominations ===
Guildford Baptist Church and the New Life Baptist Church at Stoughton are part of the Guildford Network of the South Eastern Baptist Association. Ebenezer Chapel in Ripley and Bethel Chapel in Guildford are Strict Baptist places of worship affiliated with the Gospel Standard movement. Also in Guildford, Grace Church maintains links with GraceNet UK, an association of Reformed Evangelical Christian churches and organisations.

The 13-church Wey Valley Methodist Circuit administers Cranleigh, Merrow, Stoughton, West Horsley, Knaphill, Woking, Byfleet, Walton, Weybridge, and Addlestone Methodist churches and the shared Anglican/Methodist church of St Mary's in Guildford town centre, the united Anglican/Methodist church in Sheerwater, and the united URC/Methodist church in Godalming. The Wey Valley Circuit came into being in September 2016, bringing together the Guildford Circuit and the Woking and Walton Circuit. The former Shalford Methodist Church was also part of this Circuit. Effingham Methodist Church is in the eight-church Dorking & Horsham Methodist Circuit.

Guildford borough's United Reformed Church congregations are split between the Southern Synod and the Wessex Synod, two of that denomination's 13 synods in the United Kingdom. The Southern Synod administers Gomshall United Reformed Church; the Wessex Synod is responsible for Guildford (Portsmouth Road and Westborough), Normandy and Worplesdon churches. The Anglican/United Reformed shared church of St Peter's on the Bellfields estate in Guildford is also part of the Wessex Synod.

Chilworth Free Church, Horsley Evangelical Church and Send Evangelical Church are members of two Evangelical groups: the Fellowship of Independent Evangelical Churches (FIEC), a pastoral and administrative network of about 500 churches with an evangelical outlook, and Affinity (formerly the British Evangelical Council), a network of conservative Evangelical congregations throughout Great Britain.

== Current places of worship ==
Current places of worship
Name	Image	Location	Denomination/ Affiliation	Grade	Notes	Refs
St Peter and St Paul's Church (More images)		Albury; 51.2181°N 0.4975°W	Anglican	II	Henry Drummond of the Albury Park estate wanted a replica of the Romanesque Revival church at Thaon to replace the old church on the estate. William McIntosh Brooks designed the "odd" red-brick building in 1842, and Arthur Blomfield added the transepts and apse in 1868. The church is cruciform and has a prominent tower.	
Brethren's Meeting Hall (More images)		Artington; 51.2054°N 0.5921°W	Plymouth Brethren Christian Church	–	This large meeting room was registered for marriages in August 2008. It was built on derelict land outside Artington to replace a smaller Brethren meeting room in the Stoughton area of Guildford, for which a replacement had been sought since 1985. Planning permission was granted in 2004.	
St Peter's Church (More images)		Ash; 51.2491°N 0.7155°W	Anglican	II*	Although heavily restored and extended in 1865, some 13th-century work remains, and the broach spire-topped tower is 15th-century. Other features include the "very good" south door, with "very delicate" carving attributed to masons associated with Chertsey Abbey, and an octagonal timber font of the 17th century. The bells date from 1798.	
Church of the Holy Angels (More images)		Ash; 51.2486°N 0.7169°W	Roman Catholic	–	The Southwark Catholic Mission supported Ash's early Catholic community, which had its origins in Masses said at the homes of retired World War I soldiers from nearby Aldershot. A hall was used later, but in 1931 work started on a permanent church. Architect P.A. Byrne replicated the design he used for his church at Wimborne in Dorset, but omitted the tower to keep costs down. The church, originally dedicated to St Michael and All Angels (it was renamed in the 1970s), opened on 2 December 1934 and was registered for marriages in February 1936.	
St Mary's Church (More images)		Ash Vale; 51.2648°N 0.7218°W	Anglican	–	The present church, which dates from 1906, is the successor to a tin tabernacle which was built in 1885 within the parish of Ash.	
Ash Vale Christian Assembly (More images)		Ash Vale; 51.2753°N 0.7230°W	Open Brethren	–	Under the name Ash Vale Evangelical Church, this was registered for worship and marriages in October 1980. It was reported in October 2010 that the building was being demolished and rebuilt.	
St Peter's Shared Church (More images)		Bellfields, Guildford; 51.2592°N 0.5752°W	Anglican/United Reformed Church	–	This was built in 1968 as an Anglican church to the design of the Guildford Diocesan Architect. Meanwhile, Stoke Hill Congregational Church had opened on the Bellfields estate: it was registered for worship in October 1958 and for marriages in September 1965. After it closed in 1980, the two churches joined as a single congregation.	
New Hope Centre		Bellfields, Guildford; 51.2550°N 0.5800°W	Elim Pentecostal	–	This was built by the Roman Catholic Archdiocese of Southwark as Challoner Hall (named after Bishop Challoner), for which it served as a Mass centre from 22 December 1951 until 1993. It was still owned by the Catholic Church in 1996, but is now an Elim Pentecostal church. Services were also held in the adjacent Christ's College but were moved back into the church building from June 2014.	
St Luke's Church (More images)		Burpham; 51.2623°N 0.5496°W	Anglican	II	Henry Woodyer's Bargate stone-built church of 1859, originally a chapel of ease to Worplesdon, consists simply of a nave and chancel divided by a chancel arch, lancet windows and an ashlar bell-cot topped by a small, thin spire. The "well-proportioned and coherent interior" has no aisles or arcades.	
Church of the Holy Spirit (More images)		Burpham; 51.2570°N 0.5413°W	Anglican	–	Burpham's second church was built in 1966 and serves a large area of postwar housing. Damage caused by an arson attack in May 2012 was repaired in 2013–14 in conjunction with a more general refurbishment and reordering.	
Christ Church (More images)		Charlotteville, Guildford; 51.2391°N 0.5618°W	Anglican	II	Ewan Christian designed this large church in 1868 to serve an estate of contemporary houses northeast of Guildford town centre. It was built as a chapel of ease to St John the Evangelist's Church. The style is Early English Gothic Revival. The prominent buttressed tower faces the road and rises in three stages to a parapet with battlements. The body of the church has an apsidal chancel and a nave with aisles.	
Addison Hall (More images)		Charlotteville, Guildford; 51.2361°N 0.5629°W	Plymouth Brethren Christian Church	–	This meeting room is on Addison Road in the southeast of the town. In 1963 it was recorded as being the "city room" (main place of worship for Brethren) in the Guildford area.	
St Thomas's Church (More images)		Chilworth; 51.2139°N 0.5391°W	Anglican	II	This "extraordinary little building", a square pavilion of red brick with concrete roof tiles, was built in 1896 as the Greshambury Institute to the design of William Howard Seth-Smith III. It was later converted into a church to replace a tin tabernacle. A partly glazed gabled porch provides the entrance, and on the crest of the roof is a domed wooden lantern.	
Chilworth Free Church (More images)		Chilworth; 51.2131°N 0.5360°W	Evangelical	–	The church opened in its timber-built premises in 1954 and was registered for marriages ten years later.	
St Nicholas' Church (More images)		Compton; 51.2144°N 0.6348°W	Anglican	I	The site is pre-Saxons but the oldest fabric is now 11th-century. An "impressively plain" Bargate stone tower contrasts with the elaborate Romanesque 12th-century chancel. A possible anchorite cell, a 13th-century stained glass window and a Norman font are other uncommon features, but rarest of all is the two-storey double sanctuary.	
St Thomas of Canterbury's Church (More images)		East Clandon; 51.2549°N 0.4822°W	Anglican	I	In 1900 Thomas Graham Jackson added the north aisle and bell-tower in a complementary style to this "small and genuine" village church of the 12th and 13th centuries. The nave is the older part; the 13th-century chancel is a "rough" and early interpretation of the Early English Gothic style. A monument to Stuart Rendel, 1st Baron Rendel of nearby Hatchlands Park was designed by his grandson Harry.	
St Martin's Church (More images)		East Horsley; 51.2640°N 0.4317°W	Anglican	II*	A 13th-century church thoroughly restored in that style in 1869 by Henry Woodyer, the building retains its original tower and chancel arch. Part of the arcade of the nave is also an original 15th-century design. The Lovelace family mausoleum is in the churchyard.	
Horsley Evangelical Church (More images)		East Horsley; 51.2816°N 0.4374°W	Evangelical	–	The church was founded in 1952 in a flint barn built in 1867 on Duncombe Farm, one of many buildings in the village erected to the design of the Lovelace family—major landowners in the area. As Horsley Independent Evangelical Church it was registered for marriages in February 1955.	
St Lawrence's Church (More images)		Effingham; 51.2712°N 0.3984°W	Anglican	II*	Little ancient fabric remains in this 12th- and 13th-century church due to frequent restoration-particularly in 1888 by W.J. Shearburn (who designed the tower). The first rebuilding was as early as 1388, when William of Wykeham ordered work to be carried out following neglect by Merton Priory. Many of the windows date from the 15th century.	
Effingham Methodist Church (More images)		Effingham; 51.2713°N 0.3998°W	Methodist	–	A house in this village was licensed for Nonconformist worship in 1844 by members of the Wesleyan chapel at Dorking. A permanent chapel, of flint and brick with a gabled slate roof, was built in 1854, a hall was added a century later, and the interior was reordered in 1993. The chapel has been registered for marriages since June 1886.	
Church of Our Lady of Sorrows (More images)		Effingham; 51.2735°N 0.3988°W	Roman Catholic	–	Edward Bonner was the architect of Effingham's Catholic church, which was completed in 1913 and registered for marriages four years later. Ian Nairn considered it more medieval in style than the genuinely 13th-century Anglican parish church. The symmetrical façade had a pyramid-capped tower flanked by aisles, and the walls are of flint. The now demolished St Alphege's Church at West Horsley was a daughter church and was served from here.	
St Michael's Church (More images)		Farley Green; 51.1965°N 0.4835°W	Anglican	–	Brook Farm was established in 1839 in this remote hamlet in Albury parish. A barn was built between 1840 and 1880 and was used for agricultural purposes until 1922. The subsequent owner of the land died in 1929 and his widow presented the barn to the parish so it could be converted into a chapel of ease in his memory. It opened in 1930.	
St Augustine's Coptic Orthodox Church (More images)		Gomshall; 51.2193°N 0.4437°W	Coptic Orthodox	–	In 2011 the Coptic Orthodox Church bought this former Roman Catholic chapel dedicated to St Mary of the Angels, and rededicated it to St Augustine. The church had been built in 1964 to replace a Nissen hut, and was known as the "Bingo Chapel" because residents of Gomshall and Shere raised much of the money at bingo evenings. It was part of the parish of Chilworth Friary Church (the Holy Ghost).	
Gomshall Chapel (More images)		Gomshall; 51.2193°N 0.4464°W	United Reformed Church	–	The chapel was opened in October 1820 by the Surrey Congregational Mission at a cost of £300, donated mostly by members of other churches. By 1869, the building had become "dilapidated and wretched", and as congregations grew it was improved and enlarged twice—in that year at a cost of £110, and again in 1887 for £524. It was registered for marriages in November 1888. Felday Chapel at Holmbury St Mary was founded as a daughter church in 1825.	
Guildford Cathedral (More images)		Guildford; 51.2411°N 0.5900°W	Anglican	II*	Edward Maufe's "conservative", "undramatic Curvilinear Gothic" (Note: i.e. Gothic of the late Decorated period.) cathedral was designed in 1932–33 but completed in stages between 1954 and 1966. It is a cruciform building of pale brick with a tower over the central crossing. The "noble and subtle" interior is spacious and plain.	
Holy Trinity Church (More images)		Guildford; 51.2359°N 0.5707°W	Anglican	I	This red-brick church of 1749–63 incorporates the Weston Chapel of 1540, which has chequerwork walls of alternating freestone and flint. The rebuilding, in a Palladian style by London architect James Horne, was prompted by the collapse of the original tower. Arthur Blomfield added the apsidal chancel in 1888. A large church on a prominent site, it is known as Guildford's "Upper Church".	
St John the Evangelist's Church (More images)		Guildford; 51.2470°N 0.5711°W	Anglican	II*	T. Goodchild restored this 14th- and 15th-century church in 1858, and more work was undertaken in the late 20th century. Surviving original features include the tower and moulded tower arch, a 16th-century chapel on the north side, the arcade on the south side of the chancel and a "vigorous" five-light east window. The church is in the ancient parish of Stoke was owned by Lewes Priory.	
St Nicolas' Church (More images)		Guildford; 51.2346°N 0.5774°W	Anglican	II*	The present appearance date from Teulon and Christian's restoration of 1870–75, but the Loseley Chapel survives from the 15th century. It contains memorials to the More-Molyneuxs of Loseley Park. The style is 13th-century Gothic Revival, executed in Bargate stone.	
St Saviour's Church (More images)		Guildford; 51.2376°N 0.5726°W	Anglican	II	H.S. Legg and Sons designed this prominently sited town church in 1895 in the Perpendicular Gothic Revival style. The buttressed corner tower with tall spire dominates the building. Sandstone and ashlar are the main building materials. A church room served the area, which was in the parish of Stoke (St John the Evangelist's), from 1892; the next year a separate parish was formed.	
St Mary's Church (More images)		Guildford; 51.2346°N 0.5746°W	Anglican/Methodist	I	T. Goodchild's restoration of 1862 did not eliminate the 11th- and 12th-century fabric of this ancient parish church. The tower is the oldest part; much of the building dates from the 1180s. The chancel had an apse until it was demolished in 1825. Guildford Methodist Church officially joined St Mary's on 1 September 2013, and the church is now a joint Anglican and Methodist congregation.	
Grace Church Guildford (Chertsey Street) (More images)		Guildford; 51.2386°N 0.5708°W	Baptist	–	The congregation has occupied a former Primitive Methodist chapel since 1953 but can trace its origins back to the "Charcoal Barn Chapel" on Tunsgate, opened in the 1680s. Secessions in 1837 and 1879 resulted in new Baptist causes being founded in the town—respectively, the present Guildford Baptist Church and Bethel Strict Baptist Chapel. Another congregation was planted out of Chertsey Street in 1992 at the former Guildford Park Evangelical Church. This became independent, but in January 2018 the two churches reunited as Grace Church; at this time, the original name of Chertsey Street Baptist Church was changed.	
Guildford Baptist Church (More images)		Guildford; 51.2332°N 0.5769°W	Baptist	–	In 1824 or 1837 (Note: The church's own history gives 1824 for the year "when a group of Calvinist Dissenters began to meet in a room in Quarry Street", but Chambers (1952) and the Chertsey Street Baptist Chapel give 1837 as the year.) some members of Charcoal Barn Chapel seceded and began meeting in a room in Quarry Street. This was succeeded by Hepzibah Chapel at Barrack Field and then by Commercial Road Chapel, opened on 24 August 1862. Originally Strict Baptist, the cause moved towards General Baptist (open communion) beliefs. Urban renewal led to the compulsory purchase and demolition of the chapel, and the church moved to the new Millmead Centre in 1972. It was registered in February of that year.	
Kingdom Hall		Guildford; 51.2368°N 0.5679°W	Jehovah's Witnesses	–	This building is set behind Guildford High Street and was registered in February 1967. It serves the Guildford, East and Guildford, West Congregations of Jehovah's Witnesses.	
Guildford Synagogue (More images)		Guildford; 51.2399°N 0.5705°W	Jewish	–	A medieval synagogue existed near Guildford High Street, but the present building was opened in 1979 by Chief Rabbi Immanuel Jakobovits. It replaced a succession of rented halls and rooms previously used by the modern-day community. It was registered for marriages in 1998. The tradition is Ashkenazi Orthodox.	
Friends Meeting House (More images)		Guildford; 51.2373°N 0.5720°W	Quaker	II	Quakers first worshipped in Guildford in 1655, congregations numbered 400–500 by 1669 and a meeting house and burial ground existed by 1673. The present hipped-roofed red-brick building, rebuilt on the same site as the old meeting house when that became dilapidated, dates from 1805. The wide façade has arched sash windows and an off-centred porch (added in 1913).	
St Joseph's Church (More images)		Guildford; 51.2393°N 0.5680°W	Roman Catholic	–	The present church stands on the site of an old quarry and dates from 1984. It replaced the town's first permanent Catholic church on Chertsey Street, erected in 1860 on land bought eight years earlier and rebuilt by Ingress Bell in 1881. This needed expansion and refurbishment by the 1980s, and the site was sold for offices and a larger church built instead. Local architects Nye Saunders & Partners (job architect Richard Greening) designed the red-brick building.	
Salvation Army Citadel (More images)		Guildford; 51.2403°N 0.5764°W	Salvation Army	–	The present building on Woodbridge Road was registered for marriages in October 1978 and replaced a hall in Onslow Street which was registered between December 1911 and April 1972. A converted drill hall in Leapale Lane was registered for Salvation Army use in the intervening years.	
Bethel Strict Baptist Chapel (More images)		Guildford; 51.2383°N 0.5718°W	Strict Baptist	–	When the old Baptist chapel in Commercial Road adopted General Baptist beliefs, some Strict Baptist members seceded and founded a new congregation. They met in a room, then Ward Street Hall, a tin tabernacle on Martyr Street and finally the present chapel, which dates from 1910.	
Guildford United Reformed Church (More images)		Guildford; 51.2318°N 0.5787°W	United Reformed Church	–	Architects Barber, Bundy & Greenfield (job architect D. Bundy) designed Guildford's new octagonal Congregational church in 1965 to replace the former premises in the town centre. The building is lit by windows in the clerestory. It was registered for worship and marriages in January 1965.	
Grace Church Guildford (Guildford Park) (More images)		Guildford Park; 51.2378°N 0.5844°W	Evangelical	–	This opened as Guildford Park Evangelical Church in 1940 and had an independent Evangelical congregation, but was going to be closed in 1992 until a church plant from Chertsey Street Baptist Church gave it new impetus. As congregations grew, the church was able to become independent again in 1999; but in January 2018, the two congregations reunited as a two-centre worship community called Grace Church Guildford.	
St Mary the Virgin's Church (More images)		Holmbury St Mary; 51.1883°N 0.4131°W	Anglican	I	Built in Shere parish in 1879 to the Decorated Gothic Revival design of G.E. Street and enlarged in 1966, this church is of stone and Sussex Marble. The site slopes steeply, and "clever adjustment" of the floor levels in the church allowed vestries to be placed beneath the north chapel.	
St Francis' Church		Littleton; 51.2182°N 0.5951°W	Anglican	II	James More-Molyneux of nearby Loseley Park built this as a school in 1843. By the early 20th century it had been extended and licensed as a place of worship, served by curates from St Nicholas' Church in Guildford. The "very picturesque" building has a short tower with a spire.	
St John the Evangelist's Church (More images)		Merrow; 51.2461°N 0.5273°W	Anglican	II	From the ancient parish church only some fragments remain: a zigzag-moulded Norman arch above one doorway (c. 1150) and the arcade of the south aisle. R.C. Hussey rebuilt the church in 1842 and Arthur Blomfield extended it in 1881 by adding a north aisle. The walls are of flint, dressed with stone which was painted white in the 20th century.	
Merrow Methodist Church (More images)		Merrow; 51.2478°N 0.5329°W	Methodist	–	The church was opened in 1955 to serve the recently built Bushy Hill housing estate in Merrow, and was registered for worship in June of that year. A marriage licence was granted in January 1958. A new building opened alongside this original hall in 1968, and further alterations were made in the late 20th century. The church runs or hosts various community facilities such as a crèche and a Brownie pack.	
Church of St Pius X (More images)		Merrow; 51.2450°N 0.5386°W	Roman Catholic	–	Now serving both Merrow and Burpham after the latter's Catholic church was closed, this church has its origins in Masses celebrated at St Peter's Catholic School in Merrow (St Peter's Chapel was registered for marriages in 1969). Nearby was a convent, and in the grounds a permanent church was built. This was registered in February 1973, and a parish was constituted that year.	
St Mark's Church (More images)		Normandy; 51.2549°N 0.6812°W	Anglican	II	Henry Woodyer designed Normandy's church, originally in the parish of Ash, in 1847. The simple Bargate stone and ashlar building with a belfry at one end was his first new-build church. The aisleless nave and taller chancel are flanked by a vestry and side chapel.	
Emmanuel Church (More images)		Normandy; 51.2495°N 0.6675°W	United Reformed Church	–	This now houses the congregation of the former United Reformed chapel at Willey Green. Funds raised by its sale and by the local community allowed this redundant telephone exchange building to be bought in 1985 and converted into a church, which was registered in January 1987 as Normandy United Reformed Church. Its present name was adopted in 1991.	
All Saints Church (More images)		Ockham; 51.2980°N 0.4717°W	Anglican	I	Ockham's church is well-known for its large seven-light east window, seen only in one other British church. It is mostly a 13th-century building, but the tower is Perpendicular Gothic of about two centuries later. There are many 15th-century details elsewhere as well, including windows and panelled ceilings.	
All Saints Church (More images)		Onslow Village; 51.2353°N 0.5957°W	Anglican	–	The first church in this suburb of Guildford was a tin tabernacle erected in the 1930s as daughter church of St Nicolas'. A church hall was built in the 1960s, the original building was demolished, and the present church (of modernist design with a parabolic roof) was finished in 1967.	
St Clare's Church		Park Barn, Guildford; 51.2437°N 0.6115°W	Anglican	–	This housing estate grew quickly in the 1960s, and the vicar of St Francis' Church in Westborough saw the opportunity to found a daughter church. Construction of St Clare's was carried out mostly by local residents. The churches are still part of a joint parish.	
St Mark's Church (More images)		Peaslake; 51.1912°N 0.4475°W	Anglican	II	Ewan Christian design this plain chapel of ease to St James's Church in Shere in 1889. Consisting of a nave, a chancel with a large apse and a small timber belfry with a clock, it has an array of late-19th- and early-20th-century stained glass. The main material is Wealden sandstone.	
St Michael's Church (More images)		Peasmarsh; 51.2087°N 0.5815°W	Anglican	–	Occasional services are held in this tin tabernacle in the hamlet of Peasmarsh, part of Shalford parish. Its existence was documented in the 1911 Victoria County History of Surrey.	
St Michael and All Angels Church (More images)		Pirbright; 51.2946°N 0.6499°W	Anglican	II*	This ancient church (granted to Newark Priory in 1240) was mostly rebuilt in 1784 in a "very pretty Georgian" style. The nave is of brick, but the main material is local stone which has been galleted. The battlemented tower has a thin spike-like spire. The chancel was altered in a Gothic Revival fashion in the 19th century.	
St John the Baptist's Church (More images)		Puttenham; 51.2223°N 0.6653°W	Anglican	II*	Henry Woodyer's restoration in 1861 added new details such as large dormers, but the interior retains its 12th-century appearance (the church dates from about 1160). Materials include sandstone, chalk, Bath stone and red and blue brickwork. The prominent west tower resembles that at nearby Worplesdon.	
St Mary Magdalen's Church (More images)		Ripley; 51.2991°N 0.4935°W	Anglican	II*	The chancel is c. 1160 and the east window was inserted about 70 years later, but the bulk of this puddingstone, flint and ashlar church dates from 1846 (built to the design of Benjamin Ferrey and 1869 (Thomas Graham Jackson). There is no tower or spire—only a bell-cot at the west end. The church was originally a chapel of ease to Send.	
Ebenezer Chapel (More images)		Ripley; 51.3003°N 0.4957°W	Strict Baptist	II	This small rendered brick chapel was built for Baptist pastor William Meryett from Woking in 1812. He ministered there until 1845. The sash windows and vaulted ceiling is original, but the fittings were donations from a Strict Baptist chapel in Aylesbury which closed in the 1950s. The chapel's marriage certification dates from 1949.	
St Mary's Church (More images)		Rydes Hill, Guildford; 51.2515°N 0.6018°W	Roman Catholic	–	Rydes Hill Preparatory School was founded by a religious order in 1945. A room was used as a Mass centre for local people, served by the school chaplain, and by the 1950s the congregation exceeded 100. Work on a permanent church within the school grounds started in June 1963 and it opened on 27 June 1964. It was rebuilt in 1978 after structural problems.	
St Martha-on-the-Hill Church (More images)		St Martha; 51.2247°N 0.5290°W	Anglican	II	Probably extant at the time of the Domesday survey, but ruinous by 1845, this "well-known landmark" high on the North Downs was rebuilt in a Norman style by Henry Woodyer in 1848–50. The cruciform building is of Bargate stone and sandstone and has a central tower. Originally there was a "very massive" tower at the west end.	
St Lawrence's Church (More images)		Seale; 51.2232°N 0.7170°W	Anglican	II	Little of the ancient church remains following a lengthy rebuilding and restoration (1861–73) by J. Croft, although the timber porch on the south side is 14th- or 15th-century. The pyramid-capped tower is of Bargate stone, while the rest of the building is of sandstone and clunch. The altarpiece painting is attributed to Cima da Conegliano.	
St Mary the Virgin's Church (More images)		Send; 51.2791°N 0.5408°W	Anglican	II*	This small 13th-century church (the chancel dates from the 1240s) is distant from the village. Alterations were made to the nave in the 14th century; the tower is Perpendicular Gothic; and the "simple" wooden porch is 15th-century. Some windows from that period also survive, but the church was restored in 1847.	
St Mary's Church Room (More images)		Send; 51.2924°N 0.5358°W	Anglican	–	Although this building in the centre of Send is principally used by church and community groups, meetings and similar, Anglican services are held occasionally.	
Send Evangelical Church (More images)		Send; 51.2957°N 0.5416°W	Evangelical	–	Guildford Congregational Church founded a mission in Old Woking in 1865. From 1870, open-air meetings took place in nearby Send; and in 1875 an "excellent chapel" was erected at a cost of £800. As Cartbridge Mission Chapel it was registered for marriages in January 1877. The building was subsequently extended, but the cause failed in the 1970s and the registration was cancelled in May 1973. East Horsley Evangelical Church bought the building and planted a new church there in May 1974. This was registered under its current name in February 1977.	
St Mary the Virgin's Church (More images)		Shackleford; 51.1952°N 0.6552°W	Anglican	II	This is an "above average" church designed by George Gilbert Scott in 1865 for this hamlet near Godalming. The Early English Gothic Revival building of Bargate stone has a tall central tower, north and south aisles with large arcades, and an apsidal chancel.	
St Mary the Virgin's Church (More images)		Shalford; 51.2208°N 0.5707°W	Anglican	II	Shalford's first church was medieval, but it was rebuilt in the Classical style in 1789–90. In 1847 it was replaced by a large, "ambitious but unsatisfactory" Early English Gothic Revival-style building by Benjamin Ferrey. The tall building has a large corner tower with a spire.	
St James's Church (More images)		Shere; 51.2191°N 0.4630°W	Anglican	I	This 13th-century church, "second to none in Surrey for beauty and antiquarian interest", occupies a "charming setting" in this riverside village. The tall Norman tower has a prominent spire. Minimal restoration was carried out in 1895, so most of the original features remain. Some of the building material may have been reused from ruined Roman buildings nearby.	
Harry Edwards Spiritual Healing Sanctuary (More images)		Shere; 51.2072°N 0.4574°W	Spiritualist	–	Harry Edwards founded this healing sanctuary in 1946 at Burrows Lea, a mansion in the countryside near Shere. The complex includes a chapel which is used for worship and which was registered in June 1973. The premises can be used for various events and are run by a charity.	
Emmanuel Church (More images)		Stoughton, Guildford; 51.2549°N 0.5942°W	Anglican	–	Stoughton's parish church dates from 1904 but was extended and extensively refurbished in the 1990s and 2000s. It was built of stone to a Decorated Gothic Revival design by W.G. Scott. Services are strongly evangelical in style. A brick building nearby served worshippers in the area before the church was built.	
New Life Baptist Church (More images)		Stoughton, Guildford; 51.2606°N 0.5887°W	Baptist	–	The church was founded in 1997 as a local congregation of Guildford Baptist Church members. It met in a school until acquiring the newly built Queen Elizabeth Park Centre in 2012, which it operates as a combined church and community centre.	
Stoughton Methodist Church (More images)		Stoughton, Guildford; 51.2550°N 0.5875°W	Methodist	–	The present stone-built church dates from 1895, but Wesleyan Methodists bought a plot of land in 1890 and erected a tin tabernacle the following year. After the new church was opened, this served as a church hall until a replacement was built in 1953. The new building was designed by the same architect as the Methodist chapel at nearby Shalford.	
Manor Road Evangelical Church (More images)		Stoughton, Guildford; 51.2543°N 0.5873°W	Open Brethren	–	This church was originally known as Manor Road Hall and was registered for marriages in February 1936.	
Church of the Good Shepherd (More images)		The Sands; 51.2112°N 0.7390°W	Anglican	–	This church dates from 1875 and is part of a four-church parish with the villages of Seale, Puttenham and Wanborough.	
St Paul's Church (More images)		Tongham; 51.2327°N 0.7305°W	Anglican	II	This small church dates from 1865 and was designed by Ewan Christian. It is distinguished by a round apse and a tall, steep tiled roof on which a thin flèche stands. The nave has lancet windows. Sandstone and ashlar are the principal materials.	
Tongham Christian Fellowship (More images)		Tongham; 51.2336°N 0.7262°W	Evangelical	–	This independent Evangelical church opened in 1929 and was originally registered for worship and (in March 1929) for marriages with the name Evangelical Free Church; its present name was given after it merged with the Normandy Christian Fellowship.	
St Bartholomew's Church (More images)		Wanborough; 51.2317°N 0.6624°W	Anglican	I	No more than a "tiny chapel" hidden in a farmyard, this 13th-century building (erected by monks from Waverley Abbey to replace an older church) was restored in 1862 from a ruinous condition, having been out of use for about 200 years. The walls combine flintwork, brickwork, clunch and sandstone. There is no tower or spire—simply a bell on one gable end.	
St Peter and St Paul's Church (More images)		West Clandon; 51.2508°N 0.5052°W	Anglican	II*	Restoration work of 1879 (by J.C. Boys) and 1913 (Thomas Graham Jackson) left some 12th- and 13th-century details in this flint-built church. The weatherboarded tower and shingled spire were rebuilt by Jackson. The nave (built c. 1180) is the oldest remaining section.	
St Mary's Church (More images)		West Horsley; 51.2626°N 0.4416°W	Anglican	I	Nothing remains of the Domesday-era church: the tower, which is 12th-century, is the oldest part. Otherwise the present structure dates from the 13th and 16th centuries, when the south aisle and its adjacent chapel were built. There are many memorials inside, including one attributed to Grinling Gibbons.	
West Horsley Methodist Church (More images)		West Horsley; 51.2626°N 0.4416°W	Methodist	–	The success of outdoor preaching in West Horsley by Wesleyan ministers in the late 19th century led to the construction of a chapel in 1876. It opened on Easter Monday that year. A Sunday School followed, and a new hall was built in 2011. The chapel was not registered for marriages until October 1934.	
St Francis' Church (More images)		Westborough; 51.2475°N 0.5947°W	Anglican	–	A product of interwar residential expansion, this brick church was a chapel of ease to Emmanuel Church in Stoughton between its opening in 1933 and 1958, when it became parished. Construction cost £2,300, and an extension in 1957 (including the building of a church hall) cost another £13,000. The interior was reordered in 1994. St Clare's Church on the Park Barn estate was founded by the vicar of St Francis' in the 1960s.	
Westborough Church (More images)		Westborough; 51.2496°N 0.5971°W	United Reformed Church	–	This opened as a Congregational church in 1932 and was registered for marriages in March 1934. It remains part of the United Reformed Church, the successor denomination to Congregationalism, but has a Charismatic character and functions as a cell church.	
Wisley Church (More images)		Wisley; 51.3258°N 0.4846°W	Anglican	I	The church has no dedication and remains largely as it was in the 12th century, although its carrstone walls have been rendered. A porch was added in the 17th century, and light restoration in 1872 included the construction of a vestry. There is also a timber bell-cot.	
St Alban's Church (More images)		Wood Street Village; 51.2507°N 0.6271°W	Anglican	–	This church was built in 1967 and is in the parish of Worplesdon.	
St Mary the Virgin's Church (More images)		Worplesdon; 51.2730°N 0.6066°W	Anglican	I	Although "badly restored in 1866", this large church on an elevated side is principally 15th-century with a 13th-century north chapel. The main materials are sarsen and ironstone. The west tower, "the best Perpendicular Gothic tower in Surrey" according to Nikolaus Pevsner, dates from the 1480s.	
Worplesdon United Reformed Church (More images)		Worplesdon; 51.2794°N 0.6132°W	United Reformed Church	–	Perry Hill Congregational Chapel has been in continuous use (now as a United Reformed church) since it opened on 5 June 1822. Many of the early pastors were students at the Hackney Theological College. Construction of the chapel cost £380, some of which came from Congregationalists in Guildford. The brick building was modernised in 1896; the porch, side windows and timber-framed gable date from then.	

== Former places of worship ==
Former places of worship
Name	Image	Location	Denomination/ Affiliation	Grade	Notes	Refs
Old St Peter and St Paul's Church (More images)		Albury; 51.2200°N 0.4789°W	Anglican	I	The ancient church on the Albury Park estate (of Saxon origin with additions between the 12th and 14th centuries) closed in 1842 when the new brick-built church opened in the village centre, and by 1911 it was "roofless and ... covered with masses of ivy". It was formally declared redundant in July 1973, but has now been repaired and is open to visitors.	
Catholic Apostolic Church (More images)		Albury; 51.2227°N 0.4831°W	Catholic Apostolic	II*	Henry Drummond of Albury Park opened this church in 1840 when he became involved in the Irvingite (Catholic Apostolic) movement. It became the centre of that denomination, but closed in 1950. William McIntosh Brooks designed it in a "dashing" Perpendicular Gothic Revival style, possibly with Augustus Pugin's help.	
St Catherine's Chapel (More images)		Artington; 51.2243°N 0.5787°W	Pre-Reformation	I	Long since ruinous and roofless, this ancient chapel is "a simple rectangle of rubble sandstone" in the water meadows next to the River Wey. It was within the old parish of Artington. It was originally built "before 1308" and was reconstructed by the rector of St Nicholas' Church, Guildford in 1317.	
Ash Vale Methodist Church (More images)		Ash Vale; 51.2589°N 0.7186°W	Methodist	–	This was founded as a Wesleyan chapel on 3 July 1878 and remained in use for worship until 2008 (its registration for marriages, granted in February 1881, was cancelled in September of that year). After a period of disuse, in 2009 it became a community centre and café operated jointly by the Anglican and Methodist Churches. It is known simply as "Chapel".	
Mission Hall		Bellfields, Guildford; 51.2525°N 0.5709°W	Unknown	–	This building is north of Guildford town centre on the road to Woking. Built in 1909 of brick, it was originally a mission hall but had passed out of religious use by the time it was refurbished and converted into an office in 1999–2000.	
Burpham Primitive Methodist Chapel (More images)		Burpham; 51.2534°N 0.5508°W	Methodist	–	The building stood within the boundary of Worplesdon parish during its time as a Primitive Methodist chapel. It was in use in 1914, but maps from 1935 show it had passed out of religious use by then.	
Chilworth Mission Church		Chilworth; 51.2135°N 0.5374°W	Anglican	–	This tin tabernacle was erected in the centre of Chilworth in 1896. It was linked with the parish church of Shalford, although it was in the parish of St Martha's. When St Thomas's Church opened the iron building became the village hall.	
Compton Congregational Church		Compton; 51.2131°N 0.6292°W	Congregational	–	Congregational services took place in a "rustic mission room" in this village from 1876. The building used to be a carpenter's workshop. It continued in religious use until the late 1960s.	
Independent (Congregational) Chapel		Guildford; 51.2347°N 0.5737°W	Congregational	–	The first Nonconformist chapel in Guildford was erected in 1690. The wooden building fell out of use in the 18th century, but in 1801 it was demolished and a new chapel—a prefabricated building brought by river barge—was put up on the site for Congregationalists. The street it stood on took the name Chapel Street in 1823. When a new church was built nearby in 1863, the building became the Sunday School, but it passed into secular use in 1965 and is now a restaurant.	
Providence Chapel (More images)		Guildford; 51.2343°N 0.5736°W	Independent Calvinistic	–	This chapel on Castle Street near Guildford Castle was built in 1816 for a group of Calvinists, but it passed out of religious use in 1876 and had a variety of uses after that, included a hay warehouse and a sweet factory.	
Ward Street Chapel (More images)		Guildford; 51.2376°N 0.5726°W	Unitarian	II	The building was erected in 1877 for a congregation founded three years earlier and was recorded as a Unitarian chapel in 1911. It was reregistered for Plymouth Brethren in November 1950 but closed in 1972, and by 1984 it was an office called Cyrenian House—although two years later it was described as a "refuge" building. The pale rubble-work and ashlar building is High Victorian Gothic in style and has pointed-arched windows with inset quatrefoils and trefoils.	
Felday Chapel (More images)		Holmbury St Mary; 51.1901°N 0.4129°W	Congregational	–	The success of the nearby Gomshall Chapel, opened by the Surrey Congregational Mission in 1820, led to the building of this chapel in Holmbury St Mary. It stood in the hamlet of Felday, one of two which became part of the parish of Holmbury St Mary when it was created in 1878. Felday Chapel opened on 25 October 1825.	
Normandy United Reformed Church (More images)		Normandy; 51.2580°N 0.6554°W	United Reformed Church	–	This low-set red-brick chapel, with flanking buttresses and a hipped roof, was built at Willey Green in Normandy parish with assistance from the Congregational chapel at Guildford. It opened on 4 October 1825 and was improved in 1951; but by 1975 it was no longer large enough so the building was sold and the church moved into the village's former telephone exchange. The old chapel was deregistered in February 1987.	
Providence Mission Chapel		Pirbright; 51.2938°N 0.6347°W	Congregational	–	At first, a preacher from Frimley led services in a converted smithy in this village. With support from the Surrey Congregational Mission the cause became more successful, and in August 1868 "a neat and substantial chapel" and attached manse were built by Benjamin Smith. By 1906 the chapel, which had a capacity of 120 and was the only Nonconformist chapel in the Pirbright area, had become a joint Baptist and Congregational endeavour with the name Providence Mission Chapel.	
Ripley Methodist Chapel (More images)		Ripley; 51.3005°N 0.4926°W	Methodist	–	The chapel was originally Wesleyan and was in use until the early 21st century. It was registered for marriages in August 1943.	
Congregational Mission Hall		Rydes Hill, Guildford; 51.2523°N 0.6089°W	Congregational	–	Served from the Congregational church at Worplesdon (Perry Hill), in whose parish it was situated, this closed c. 1927.	
St William of York's Church (More images)		Send; 51.2889°N 0.5254°W	Roman Catholic	–	Originally this church had its own parish, but latterly it was served from St Dunstan's at Woking. Regular services stopped in mid-2006. The church dated from 1940 and was registered for marriages in July 1941; official deregistration came in November 2011.	
Shalford Methodist Church (More images)		Shalford; 51.2131°N 0.5646°W	Methodist	–	Built alongside the village's original Wesleyan chapel of 1843, this stone church superseded it when it opened in 1895. It was part of the Guildford Methodist Circuit. The building was refurbished in 2000, but a declining and ageing congregation forced the church to close with effect from 31 August 2012, five days after the final service was held. Its marriage registration was formally cancelled in February 2016.	
Shalford Wesleyan Chapel		Shalford; 51.2131°N 0.5647°W	Methodist	–	This building was the original Wesleyan chapel in the village. It was superseded by the much larger present chapel (closed in 2012) when that opened next door in 1895.	
St Mary's Church Centre		West Horsley; 51.2795°N 0.4454°W	Anglican	–	Built in 1963 as a church hall, this was also used for Anglican services within the parish of West Horsley but is now solely a community hall (called The Wheelhouse) and administrative centre.	

== Former places of worship demolished since 2000 ==
Former places of worship
Name	Image	Location	Denomination/ Affiliation	Grade	Notes	Refs
Guildford Methodist Church (More images)		Guildford; 51.2415°N 0.5772°W	Methodist	–	Designed by A. Saunders in 1966 and distinguished by "a very thin fibreglass spire", this building replaced the Methodist chapel on North Street. The cost of construction and the land was £124,000. It was registered for marriages in March 1966; but after many years of close partnership, the congregation joined St Mary's Anglican church. The last service was held on 1 September 2013, and the building was sold for redevelopment. Housing now occupies the site.	

== Bibliography ==
- Blatch, Mervyn (1997). The Churches of Surrey. Chichester: Phillimore & Co. ISBN 1-86077-002-9.
- Butler, David M. (1999). The Quaker meeting houses of Britain: Nottinghamshire to Scotland. Vol. 2. Friends Historical Society. ISBN 0-900469-44-7.
- Chambers, Ralph (1952). The Strict Baptist Chapels of England: Surrey and Hampshire. Vol. 1. Thornton Heath: Ralph Chambers.
- Cleal, Edward E.; Crippen, T. G. (1908). The story of Congregationalism in Surrey. London: James Clarke & Co.
- Facey, Roy A., ed. (1981). International Church Index (Doctrinal). Index Publications. ISBN 0-907578-00-4.
- Hague, Graham; Hague, Judy (1986). The Unitarian Heritage: An Architectural Survey (1st ed.). Sheffield: Unitarian Heritage. ISBN 0-9511081-0-7.
- Hill, Roy (2002) [1990]. The Assemblies Address Book (PDF) (5th ed.). Bristol: Christian Year Publications. ISBN 1-872734-25-1. Archived from the original (PDF) on 19 September 2004.
- Methodist Church of Great Britain (1947). Methodist Church Buildings: Statistical Returns including Seating Accommodation as at July 1st, 1940 (PDF). Manchester: The Department for Chapel Affairs. (Available online in 14 parts; Guide to abbreviations on page 6)
- Nairn, Ian; Pevsner, Nikolaus (1971) [1962]. The Buildings of England: Surrey (2nd ed.). Harmondsworth: Penguin Books. ISBN 0-300-09675-5.
- s.n. (1993). Arundel and Brighton Diocesan Directory 1993 (27th ed.). Purley: Roman Catholic Diocese of Arundel and Brighton.
- Stell, Christopher (2002). Nonconformist Chapels and Meeting-houses in Eastern England. Swindon: English Heritage. ISBN 1-873592-50-7.
- Stockwell, Arthur H., ed. (1909). The Baptist Churches of Surrey. London: Arthur Stockwell.
