= Chilworth Manor, Surrey =

Country house in Surrey, England

Chilworth Manor
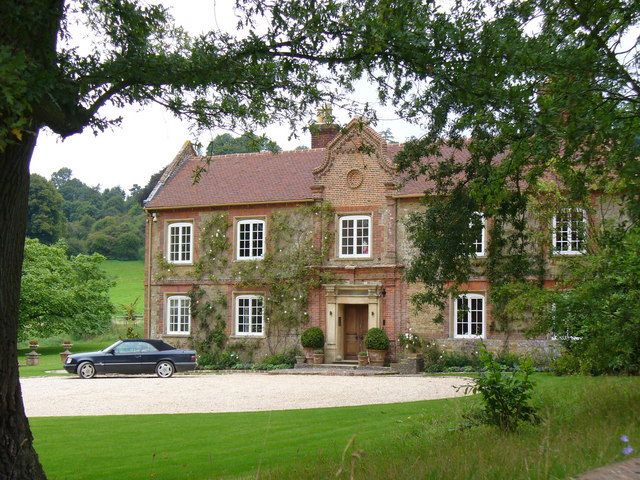

- Location within Surrey
- 51°13′14.1″N 0°31′51.6″W
- Type: Country house
- Location: Blacksmith Lane, Chilworth
- OS grid reference: TQ 02720 47855

Site notes
- Area: Surrey
- Owner: Private

Listed Building – Grade II
- Official name: Chilworth Manor
- Designated: 14 Jun 1967
- Reference no.: 1188708

Chilworth Manor is a historic country house located midway between Chilworth, Surrey and St Martha's Hill to the north. The manor is grade II listed by Historic England.

== History ==
Chilworth was the name of an ancient manorial estate recorded in the Domesday Book (1086) as belonging to Alwin before the conquest, and afterwards to Odo of Bayeux. This then lay within the lordship of Bramley, afterwards partly within St Martha and partly in Shalford, and latterly within Albury. On the site of Chilworth manor house there formerly existed a monastic cell belonging to the Augustinian canons of Newark Priory, Surrey (between Ripley and Pyrford), one of whom probably served the parishioners of St Martha during the Middle Ages.

Newark Priory was dissolved by Henry VIII and by 1580 Chilworth manor was owned by William Morgan (c. 1525–1602), who also held the neighbouring manor of Tyting with Henry Polsted (whose son Richard Polsted married a daughter of Sir William More (died 1600) of Loseley Park). In 1583 William Morgan settled Chilworth on the marriage of his son John to his first wife, Anne Lumsford, and in 1589 upon John's second marriage, to Margery Goldinge. John was knighted at Cadiz in 1596. His wife, Lady Margaret, extended hospitality to the poet Robert Tofte and his brother at Chilworth, who dedicated his translation of Boiardo's Orlando Innamorato to her in 1598.

In 1602, the year of William Morgan's death, Sir John's daughter Anne married Sir Edward Randyll, and upon this union John bestowed a moiety of the manor of Wotton. Sir John married lastly to Elizabeth Rich, sister of Sir Nathaniel Rich and of Dame Margaret Wroth. He died at Chilworth in 1621 making a settlement of the manor by which his widow, who remarried to John Sotherton the younger, was still residing at the manor at the time of her death in 1633.

Sir Edward Randyll's family held Chilworth for over a century. Soon after the death of Sir John, Chilworth was chosen by the East India Company as the site for its manufactory of gunpowder. A 21-year lease was signed with the Randylls in 1626, but production was stopped in 1632: the Company transferred its interest to Samuel Cordwell in 1637, soon after a contract to supply King Charles I with gunpowder was made, but the king's monopoly expired in 1641. The mills were then demolished to prevent the royalists from seizing them, but by 1643 were working again, now supplying Parliament. On the expiry of the original lease in 1649, Vincent Randyll (the landlord) leased the mills on annual terms.

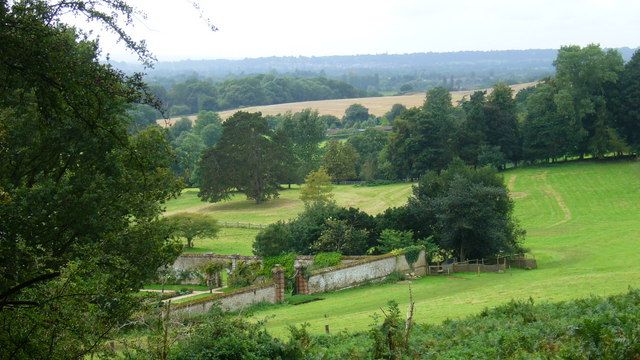
Walls of Chilworth Manor garden

The south front, the earliest part of the existing manor house, was built during the time in which Chilworth manor was owned by the Randylls. The architect is unknown. Morgan Randyll was MP for Guildford from 1680 to 1712. As a result of the costs involved in the elections, the property was sold to Richard Houlditch, a director of the South Sea Company. After losses incurred in the South Sea Bubble in 1720, the manor was again sold.

In 1725 the widowed Sarah Churchill, Duchess of Marlborough, became the owner. She added the Marlborough Wing, developed a tiered garden excavated in the sloping hillside which is still known as the "Duchess's Garden". It then passed from her grandson, John Spencer, through inheritances to the Dukes of Northumberland who held it until the 1930s. It was then acquired by Alfred Mildmay who carried out major renovations to the building.

Sir Lionel and Lady Heald bought the manor in 1945 and lived there for over 60 years. Elected MP for Chertsey in 1950, he was Attorney-General in Churchill's post-war government. She worked for many charitable causes including the National Garden Scheme of which she was chairwoman.

Since Lady Heald's death in 2004 extensive restoration work has been carried out and the garden, fittingly, opened as part of the National Garden Scheme.

== In popular culture ==
John Bunyan, who lived nearby at one time, is reputed to have based The Hill of Difficulty in Pilgrims Progress on the path from the manor to St Martha's Chapel.

The house has been featured in a number of films and TV series over the years.

=== Films ===
- The Passionate Stranger (1957)
- I Don't Speak English (1995)
- Sliding Doors (1998)
- Parting Shots (1998)
- The Wedding Date (2005)

=== TV ===
- Just William – Boys will be Boys (1995)
- Daniel Deronda (2002)
- Foyles War – The Funk Hole (2003)
- Agatha Christie's Marple – A Murder is Announced (2005)
- Agatha Christie's Poirot – Taken at the Flood (2006)
