= St Mary's Church, Guildford =

- St Mary's Church
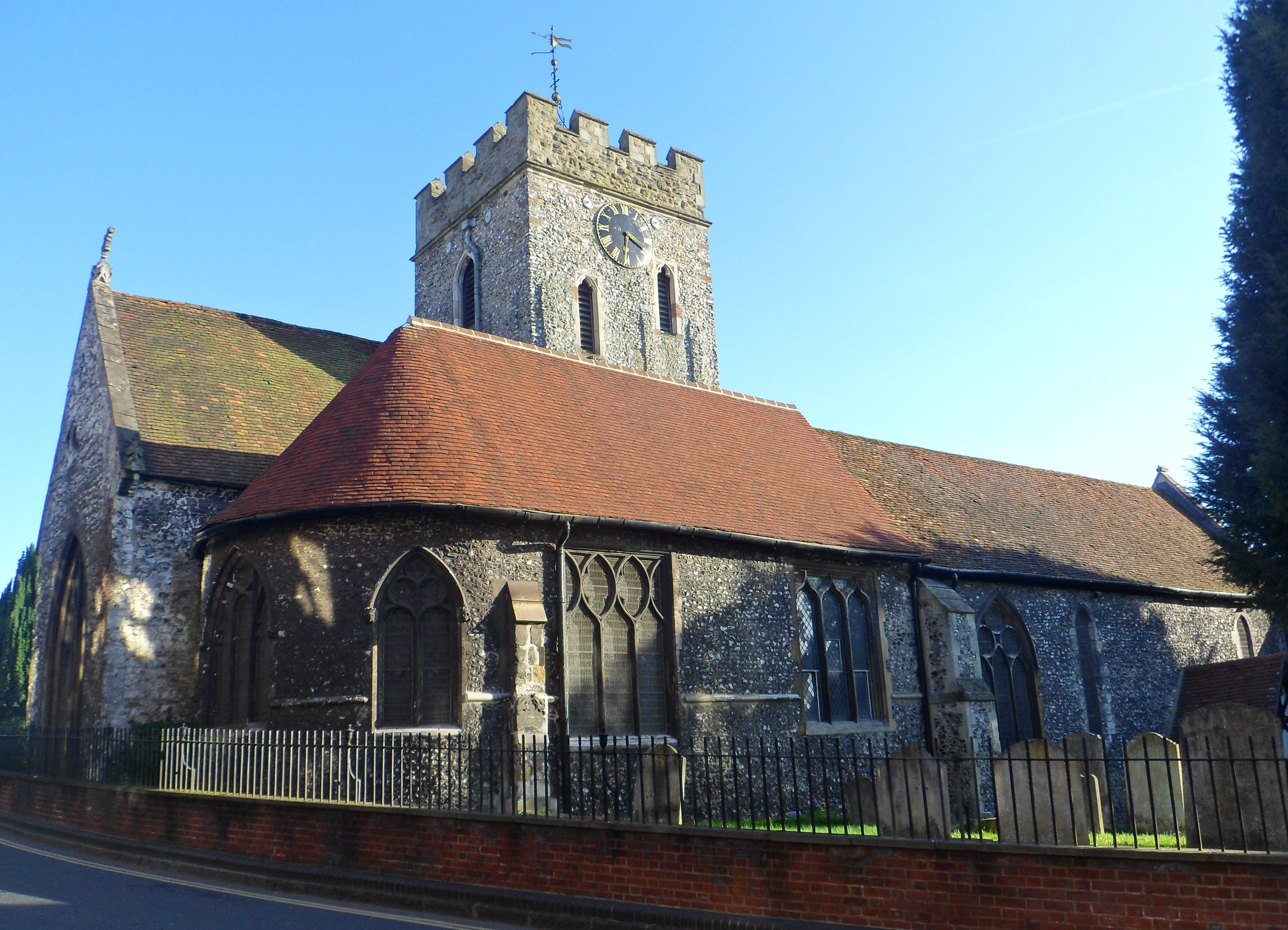
- St Mary's Church from Quarry Street

- Location in Surrey
- 51°14′05″N 0°34′28″W
- Location: Quarry Street, Guildford
- Country: England
- Denomination: Church of England / Methodist
- Churchmanship: Liberal

History
- Dedication: St Mary

Architecture
- Heritage designation: Grade I
- Designated: 1 May 1953

Specifications
- Materials: Flint and chalk rubble

Administration
- Parish: Holy Trinity and St Mary

Clergy
- Rector: Simon Butler

St Mary's Church is an Anglican church in Guildford in Surrey, England; the church's Anglo-Saxon tower is the oldest surviving structure in the town. Charles Lutwidge Dodgson, the author Lewis Carroll, preached here and his funeral was held in the church in 1898. Coming under the Diocese of Guildford, the church has been Grade I listed since 1953.

== History ==
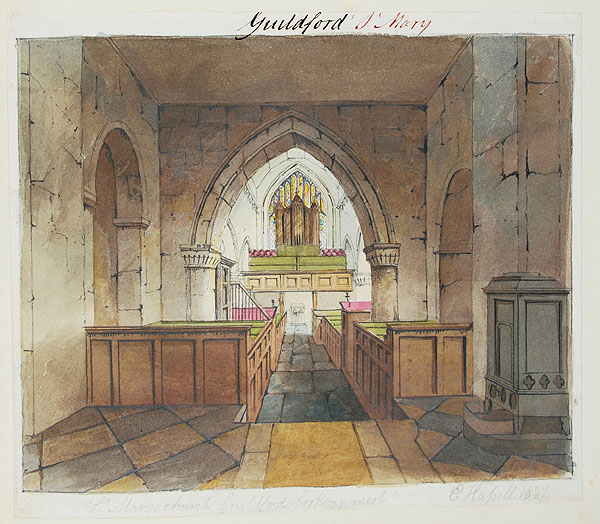
Watercolour of the interior of St Mary's by John Hassell (about 1824)

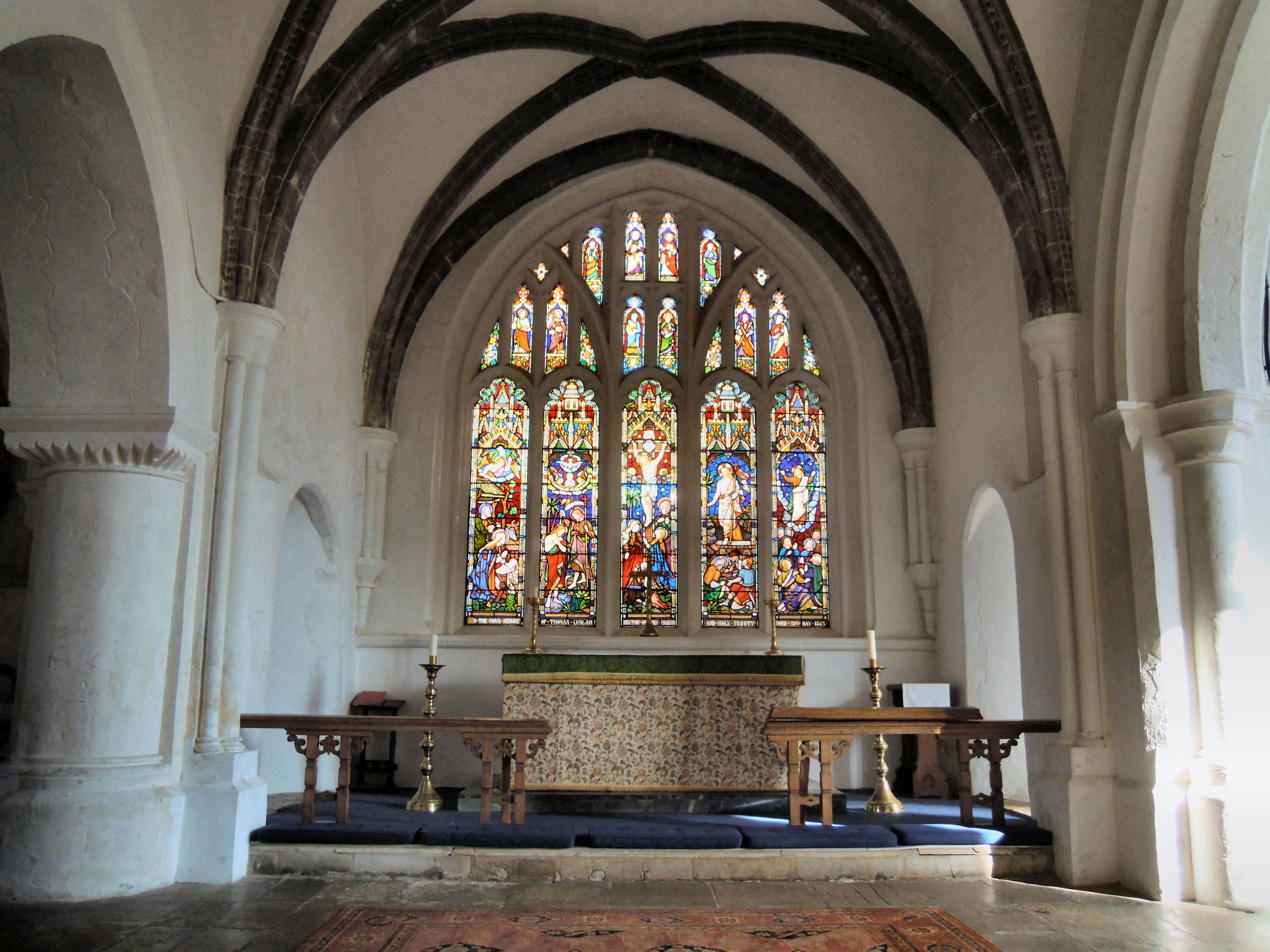
The altar and East Window in 2016

A stone Anglo-Saxon church built in about 1040 AD the tower of which still stands today, St Mary's Church is believed to stand on the same site as Guildford's first church which was probably a small timber structure built in about 600 AD. St Mary's Church tower, which is built of rough flint, is the oldest surviving piece of architecture in Guildford being at least 70 years older than the nearby Guildford Castle. As the castle was a popular royal residence in the 12th and 13th centuries and as St Mary's is very close to it, it was used occasionally for royal worship and Thomas Becket may have celebrated Mass here. In 1274, Henry, the six-year-old son of Edward I was dying at the castle; 13 widows held an all-night vigil in the church for him, but in vain. After he died three masses were celebrated in St Mary's for his soul.

In about 1120 the canons of Merton Priory acquired St Mary's and rebuilt the church giving it the cross-shaped plan present today. In the 1140s the St John's chapel was added to the south of the church. Much of the present building dates from the 1180s. The chancel had an apse until it was demolished in 1825. In the 14th century a large number of windows were inserted, while the chancel has a 15th-century east window of five cinquefoiled lights with tracery over, in a four-centred head. During the Reformation the church underwent significant changes in the way it was decorated, but the corbels mainly survived, including one on the south side of a carving of ravens placing food into Elijah's mouth. Two other corbels in the north aisle, however, which had been carved to show angels, still show signs of destruction from that period.

Guildford Methodist Church officially joined St Mary's on 1 September 2013, and the church is now a joint Anglican and Methodist congregation as well as being part of a joint parish with nearby Holy Trinity.

== Design ==
In 1825 the chancel was shortened to allow for the adjacent Quarry Street to be widened. In 1862 St Mary's was restored by Thomas Goodchild (died 1885) when the stonework was renewed and the gallery removed. Goodchild's restoration did not eliminate the 11th- and 12th-century fabric of the ancient parish church. The whole of the exterior of the walling (excepting that of the tower and the east wall, which is of chalk) has been encased with flint, and all the buttresses are Victorian except one. The east window is by William Holland and shows the Nativity, Baptism, Crucifixion, the Resurrection and Ascension of Jesus Christ. The west window of the north aisle is by the Royal Bavarian Art Institute for Stained Glass and dates from about 1850. The baptismal font is Victorian and has a square bowl of clunch with scalloped under-edge, resting on a chamfered square stem and four small stone shafts with scalloped capitals and moulded bases. The pulpit, which was added by Goodchild, is of stone and marble and replaced one from the 17th-century.

== Lewis Carroll ==
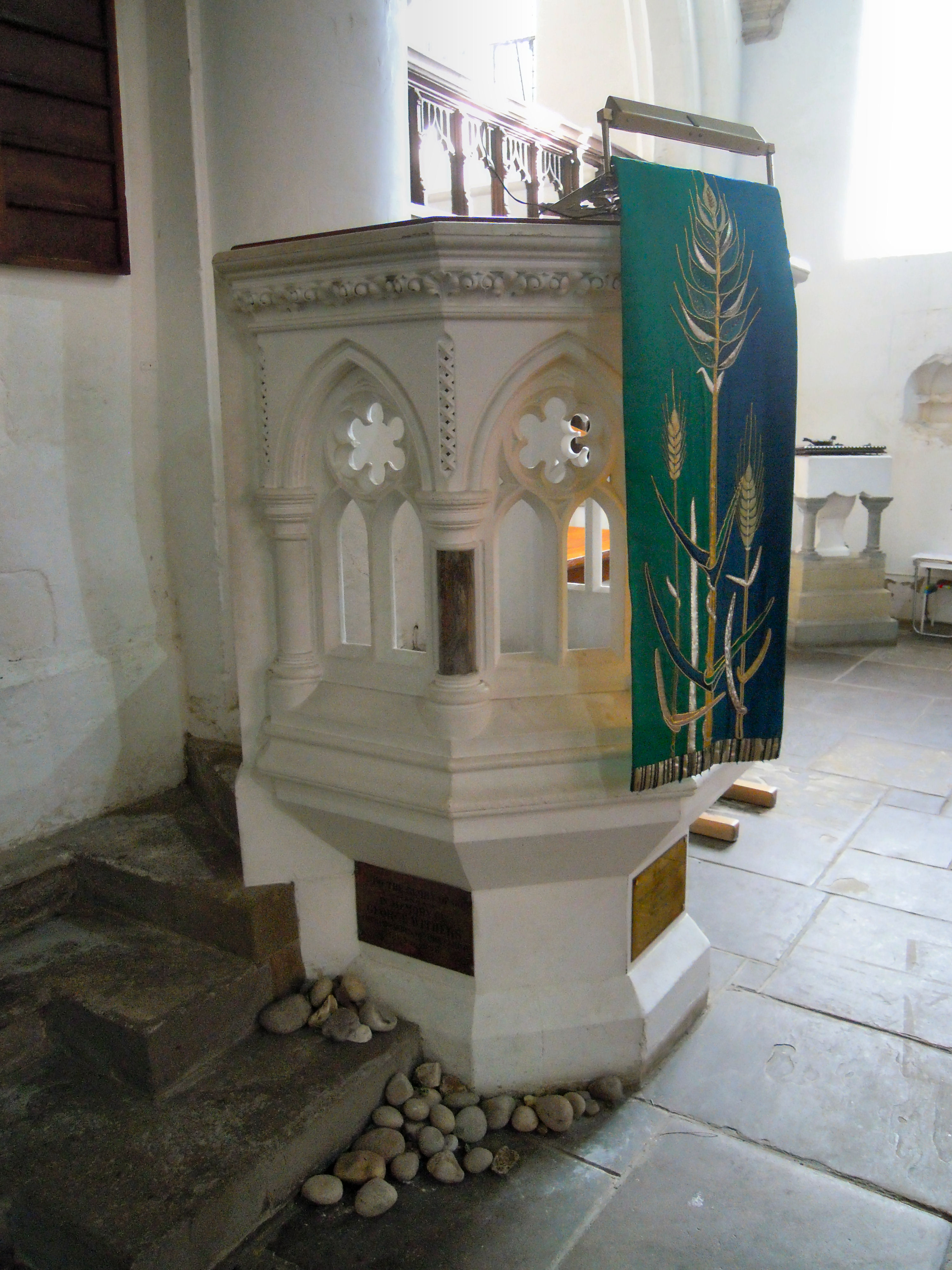
The pulpit from which "Lewis Carroll" preached

From the present pulpit the Reverend Charles Lutwidge Dodgson ("Lewis Carroll") used to occasionally preach when staying with his family in their home, The Chestnuts nearby. It was also at St Mary's that his funeral was held.

== Gallery ==
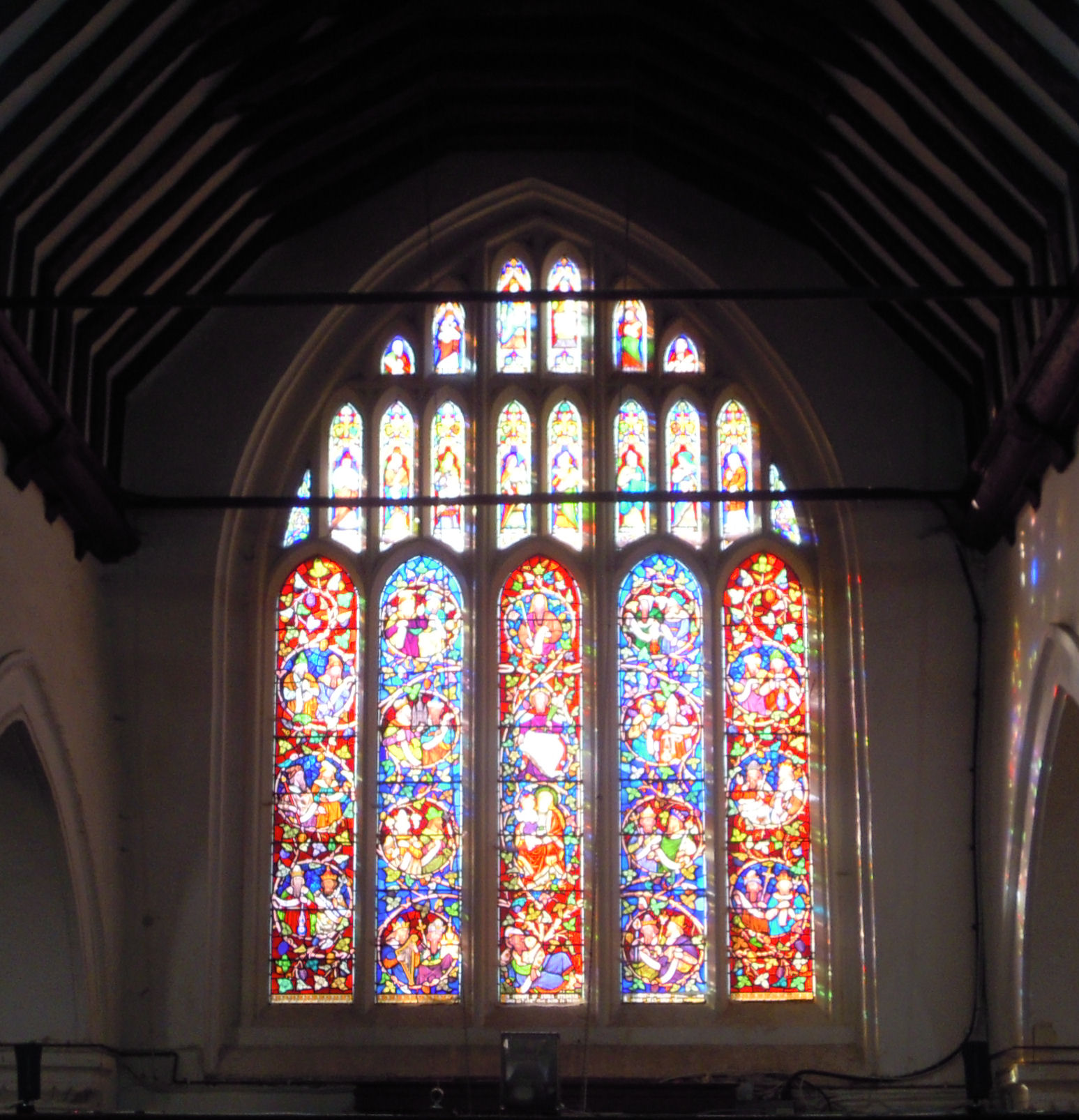
The West Window

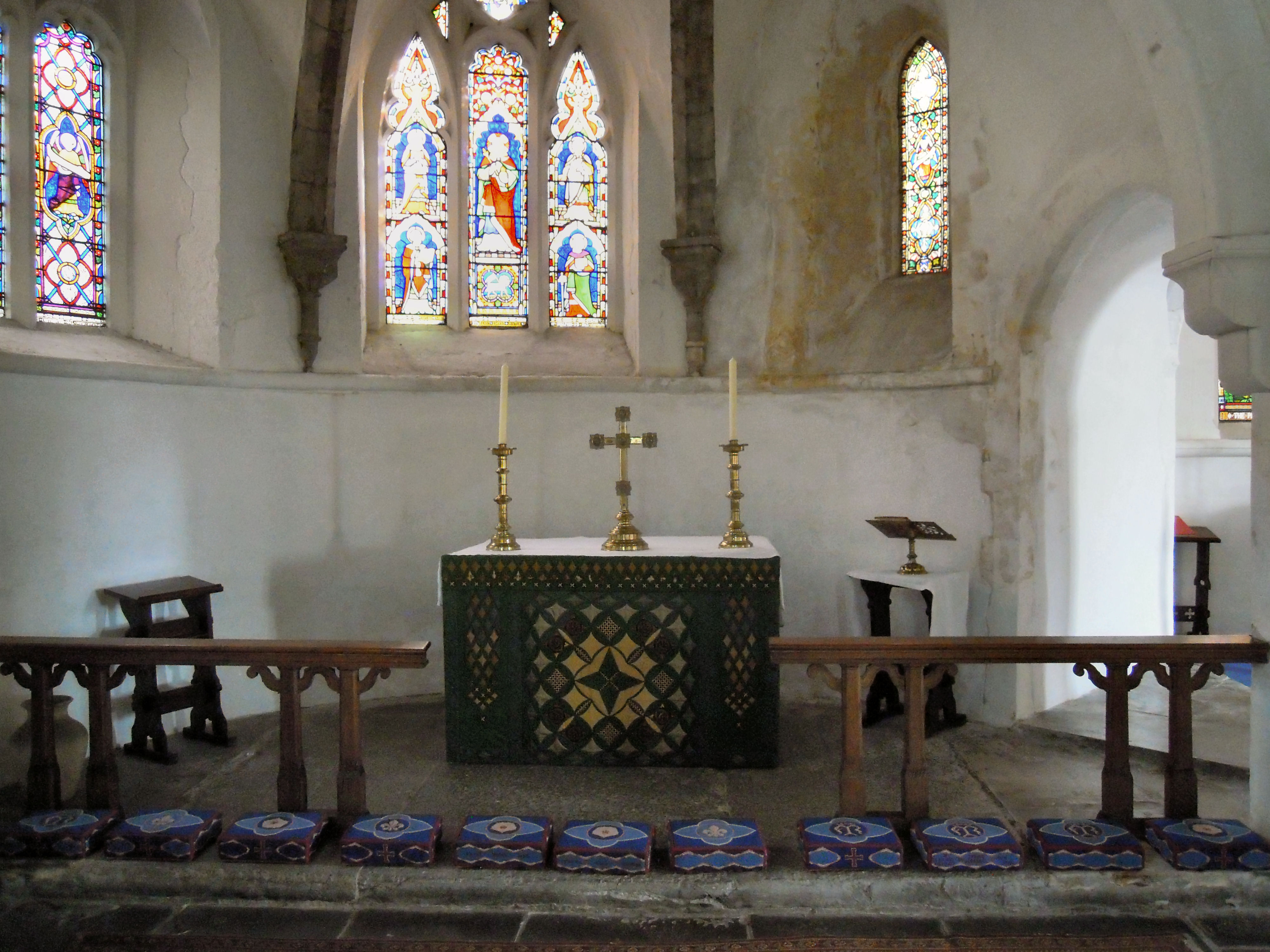
The Lady Chapel

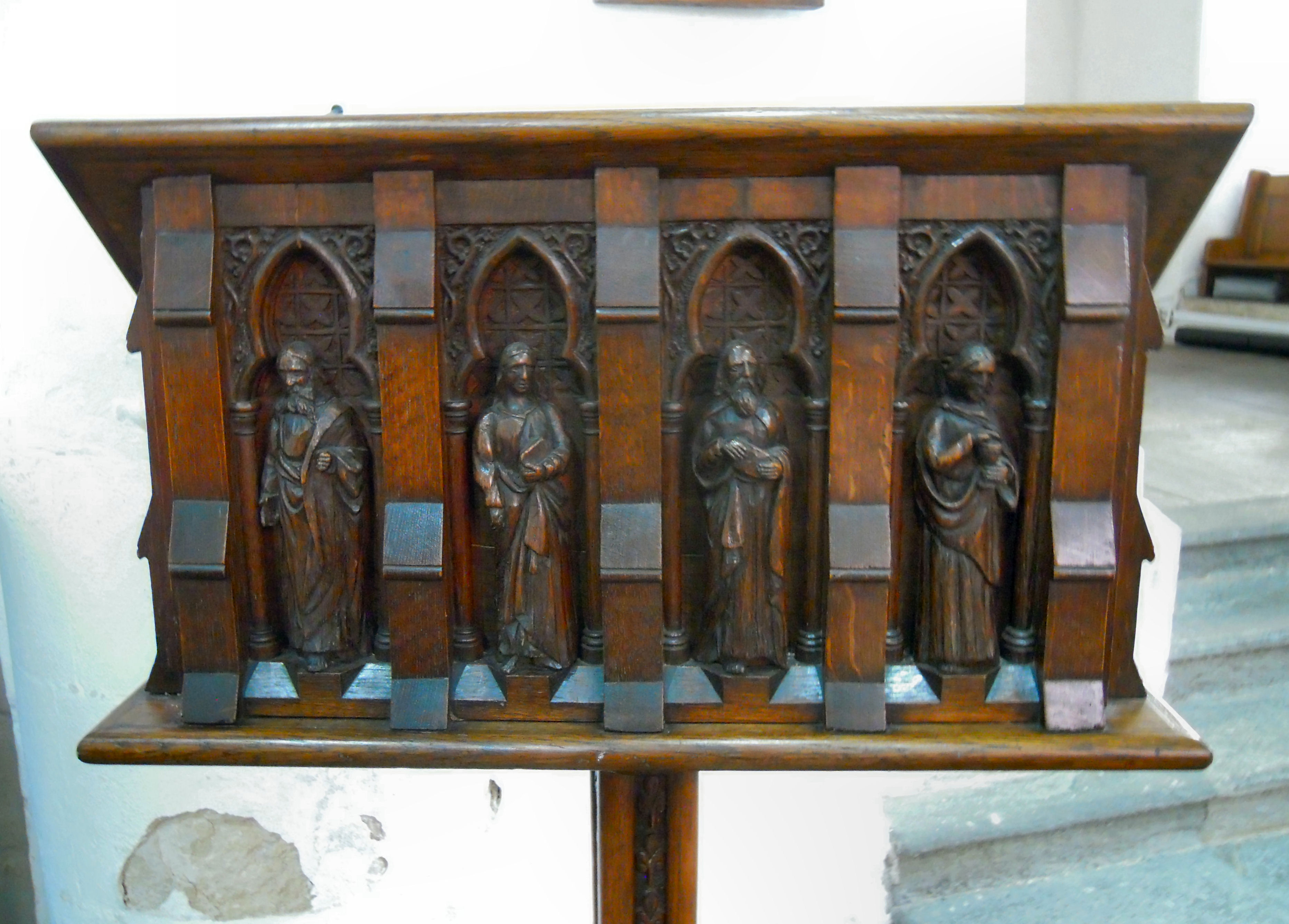
The lectern

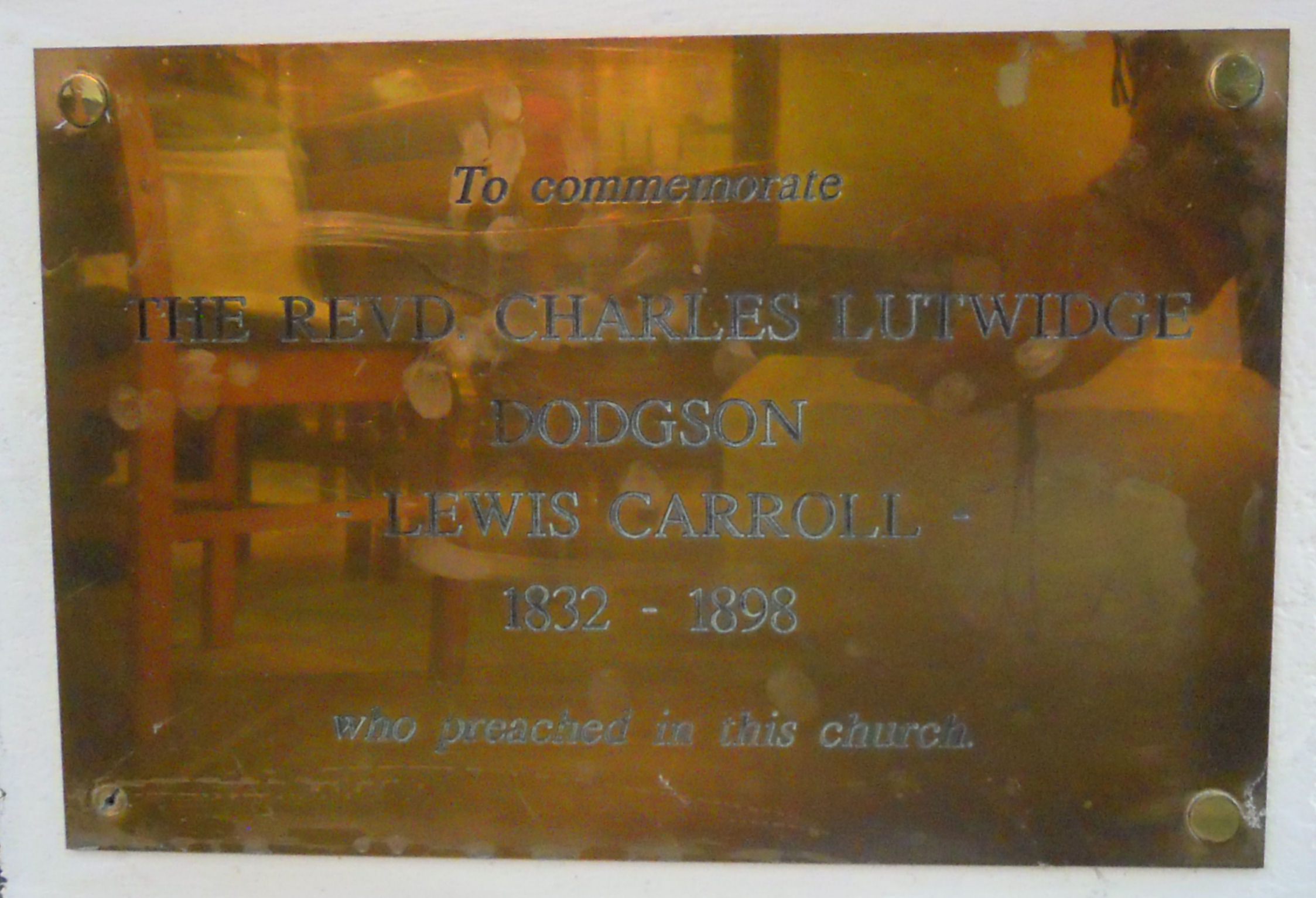
Plaque commemorating Lewis Carroll on the pulpit

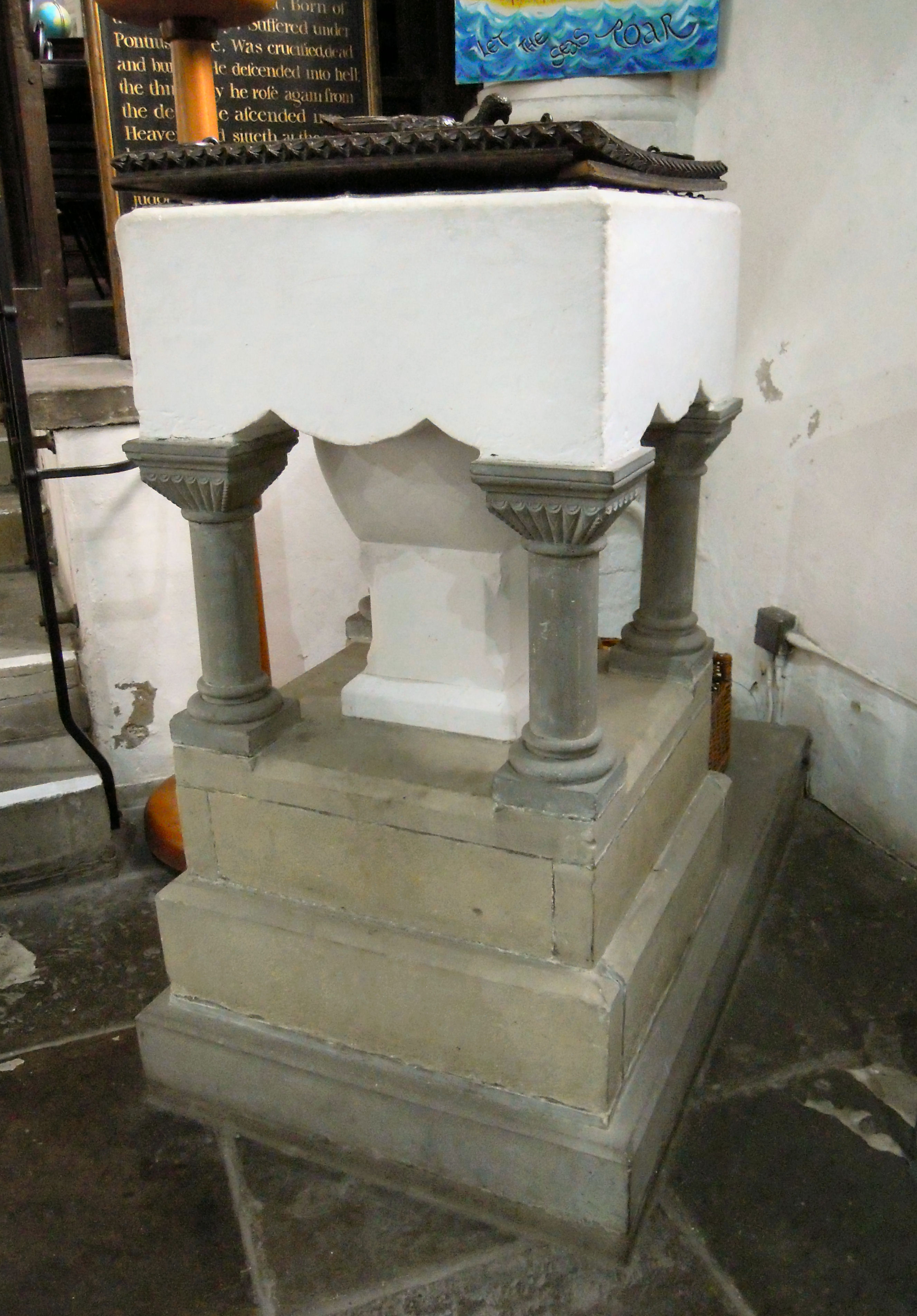
The font in St Mary's

== See also ==
- Grade I listed buildings in Surrey
- List of places of worship in the Borough of Guildford
