= Guildford Synagogue =

Synagogue in Guildford, Surrey, England

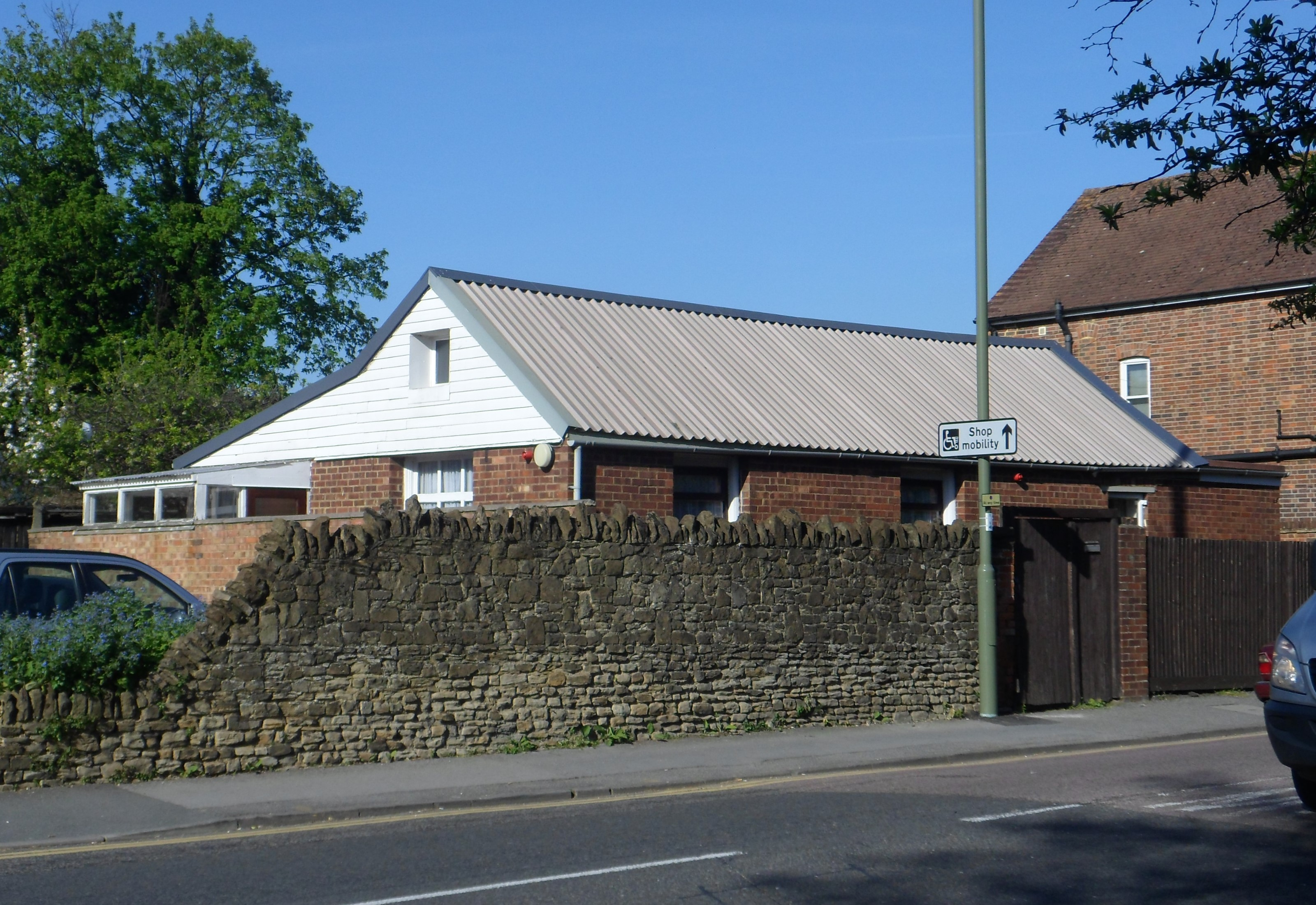
- The synagogue, in 2014

- Location of the synagogue in Surrey

Religion
- Affiliation: Orthodox Judaism
- Rite: Nusach Ashkenaz
- Ecclesiastical or organizational status: Synagogue
- Status: Active

Location
- Location: York Road, Guildford, Surrey, England GU1 4DR
- Country: United Kingdom
- Interactive map of Guildford Synagogue
- Coordinates: 51°14′24″N 0°34′14″W

Architecture
- Established: c. 1949
- Completed: 1979

Website
- guildfordjewish.com

The Guildford Synagogue is an Orthodox Jewish congregation and synagogue, located on York Road, in Guildford, Surrey, England, in the United Kingdom. The congregation was established in the 1940s, initially as the Guildford United Synagogue Membership Group, however the congregation ceased to exist from 1947. Following World War II, the Guildford & District Jewish Community, who worship in the Ashkenazi rite, was formed; and their synagogue building was completed in 1979.

== Medieval synagogue ==
Jews most likely arrived in Guildford during the 12th century. It is widely believed that they built a synagogue, c. 1180, in the High Street. There is a small plaque outside the shop to mark the spot.

In 1995, during excavations at the site of the old synagogue, archaeologists led by Mary Alexander of the Guildford Museum found a chamber with steps down from street level. It was ornately decorated with pattern designs. In the east of the room is an alcove and a pillar where scorch marks demonstrate that a light was often burning in this place. The assumption is that the alcove is the Aron Kodesh (Holy Ark) and that the mark is left from a Ner Tamid (Everlasting Light).

Being the only chamber of its kind in England, there has been much dispute over its use, but the most popular theory and all the evidence points towards the probability that Guildford has the oldest synagogue remains in the United Kingdom and one of the oldest in Western Europe.

The modern synagogue, on York Road, contains a stone from the original synagogue, presented by Guildford Museum. The actual chamber is under concrete although both the owners of the site and local historians have expressed their regret at it not having a glass floor.

== Modern synagogue ==
In 1979, having borrowed halls for years, land was bought and the community modified the building on the site to build its own synagogue. The Chief Rabbi, Immanuel Jakobovits, opened and consecrated the synagogue. To mark the occasion a plaque was laid by Theo Rubin who was the president of the community for many years. Sir Jonathan Sacks, Chief Rabbi at the time, visited the synagogue in 2006.

== Surrey Multifaith Centre ==
The University of Surrey announced plans in 2007 to build a multifaith centre on its Stag Hill Campus. The plan included a Jewish Common Room–Synagogue with a Sukkah and mikvah within the centre. The chaplaincy team at the University of Surrey are advocates of the centre which has won the backing of leading religious figures in the UK. The Jewish chaplain, rabbi Alexander Goldberg, has been an advocate for the centre within the Jewish community and beyond.

== See also ==
- History of the Jews in England
- List of Jewish communities in the United Kingdom
- List of synagogues in the United Kingdom
- List of places of worship in the Borough of Guildford
