= St Martha's Hill =

Hill in Surrey, England

Coordinates: 51°13′29″N 0°31′44″W

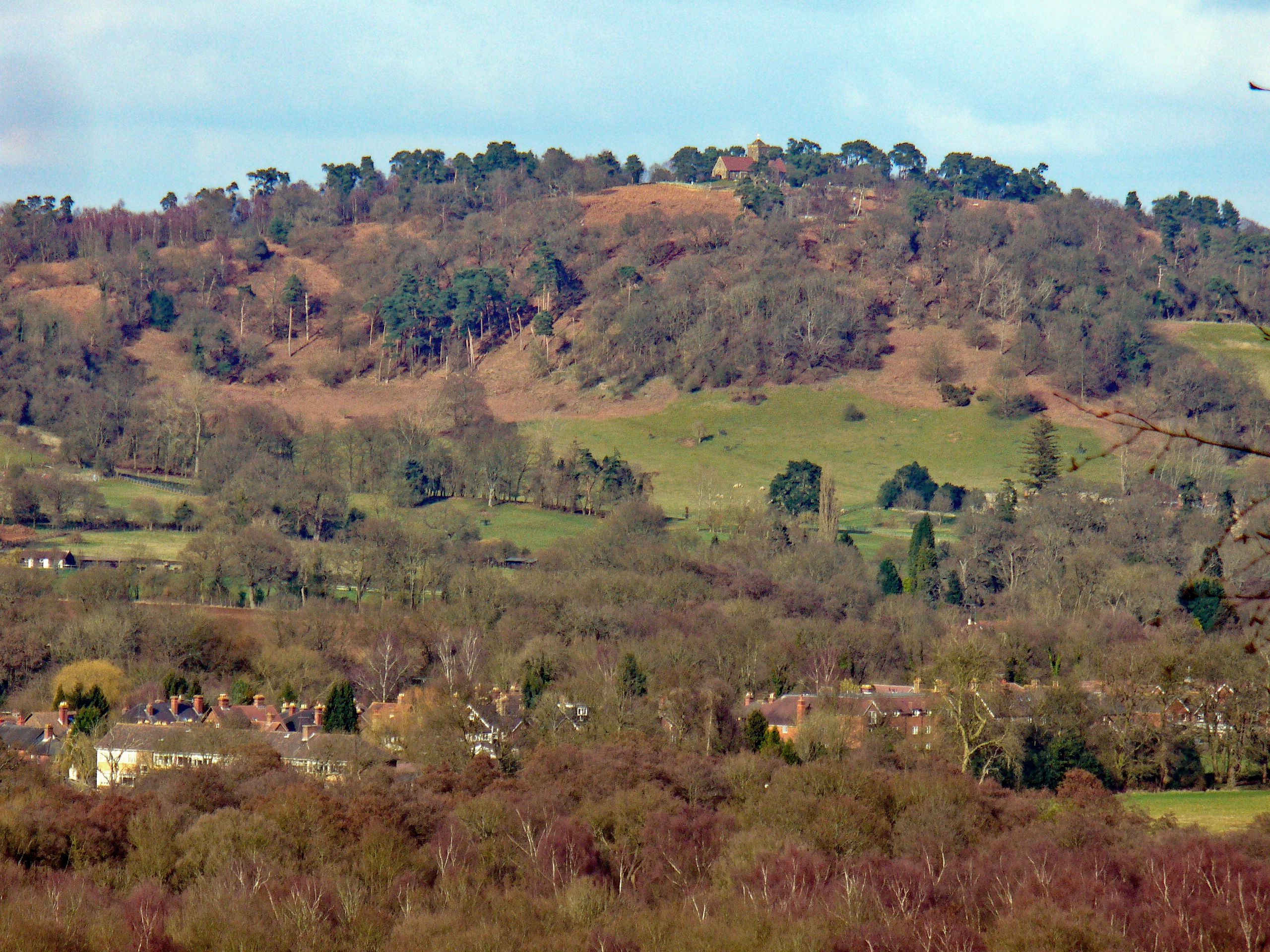
St Martha's Hill from the south

St Martha's Hill is a landmark in St Martha in Surrey, England between the town of Guildford and village of Chilworth. It is the 18th highest hill in the county and on the Greensand Ridge, in this case at the closest point to the North Downs, commencing to the immediate north at the Guildown-Merrow Down in the parishes of Guildford and Merrow. The top of the hill provides a semi-panorama of Newland's Corner also in the Surrey Hills AONB. Its church is the main amenity of the small parish extending to the south into the streets of Chilworth, with some medieval stone incorporations from a 12th-century predecessor (rebuilt 1848–1850 by Henry Woodyer) and is a wedding venue mainly to outside the sparsely populated parish.

The knoll is crossed east-to-west by the Pilgrims' Way, which is otherwise on the North Downs.

== History ==
The site contains several Megalithic and Neolithic artefacts, dating from as far back as 3500 BCE. Below the church there are five circular earthworks, believed to date back to the Bronze Age. They were excavated in 1953 but one has since been obliterated by the construction of a reservoir.

There is a traditional belief that the original name of this hill was Saints and Martyrs Hill, the martyr being St Thomas of Canterbury. Another theory said to be supported by some medieval charters contends that chapel was named after its location on "marterhill". According to a local tradition the hill has this name due to it being the location where some early Christian martyrs were burned in Saxon times.

Another curious historical note of this site is it being said to have been the location, until recently, of an ancient folk custom that took place on St. Martha's Hill on Good Friday seemingly until the end of the 19th Century:

"A custom, the origin of which is lost in the obscurity of time, prevails in the neighbourhood of Guildford of making a pilgrimage to St. Martha's (or Martyr's) Hill on Good Friday. Thither from all the countryside youths and maidens, old folks and children, betake themselves, and gathered together on one of the most beautiful spots in Surrey, in full sight of an old Norman church which crowns the green summit of the hill, beguile the time with music and dancing. Whatever the origin of this pilgrimage to St. Martha's, it is apparently one that commends itself to the taste of the present generation."

== Landmarks ==
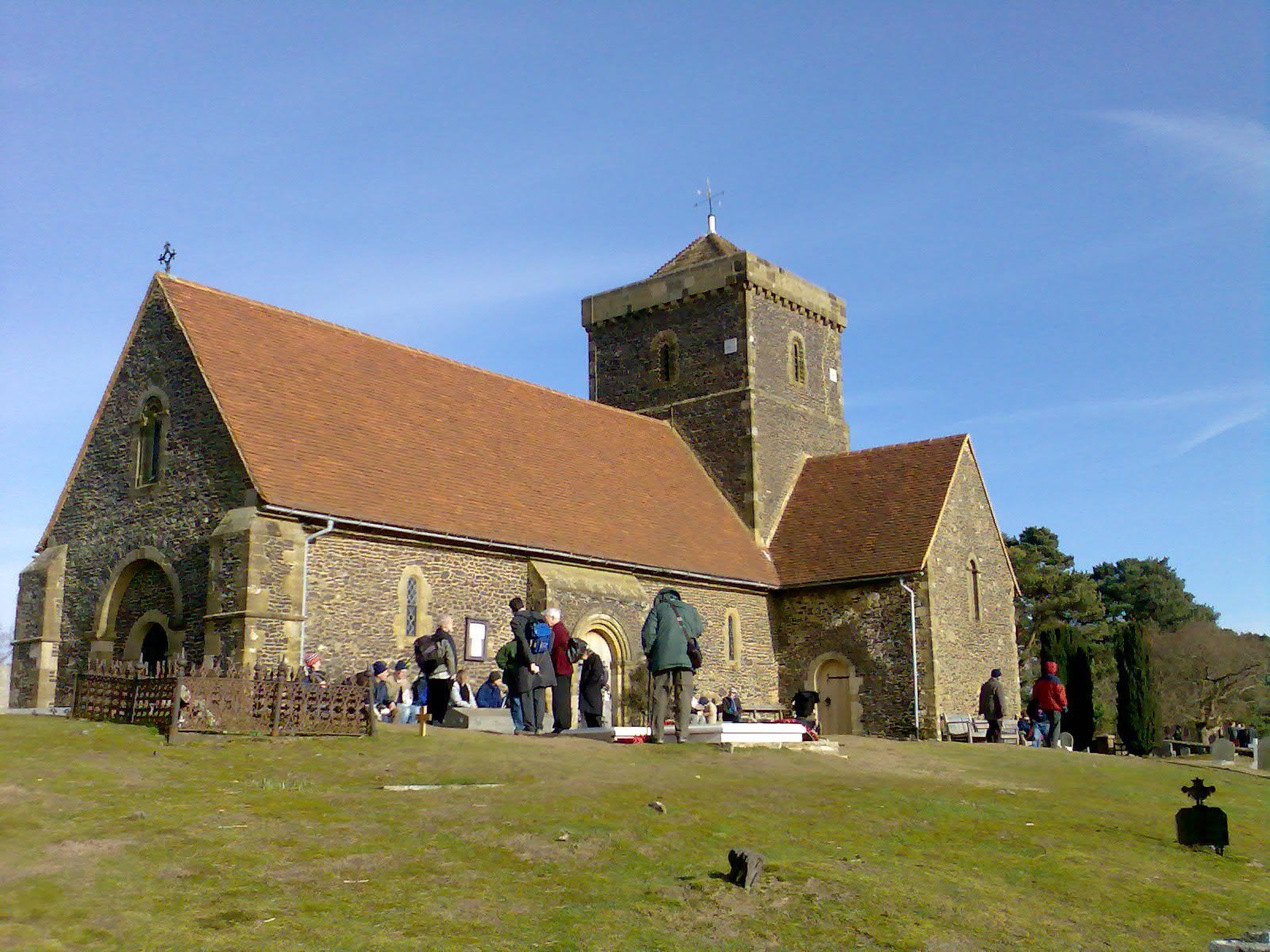
St Martha's church

St Martha's Church (also known as St Martha-on-the-Hill) is listed grade II by Historic England under the statutory buildings' protection scheme — On the top of the hill — the building is accessible only by foot. It is the only church in Surrey to be on the Pilgrims' Way and featured briefly in the 1944 film A Canterbury Tale. A 12th-century church existed here before falling into ruin by the 18th century. The church was rebuilt in 1848–50 to the designs of Henry Woodyer who incorporated many of the original 12th-century architectural features including Norman arches to the main entrance as well as zig zag moulded lancet windows on the tower. The interior is a plain, restrained style with the majority of fittings of a post 1850 date, the main exception being a 12th-century font (albeit re cut in 1850). near the front entrance. Incised graffiti, often dated by year, exists on much of the exterior dressed stonework. The church believes it may have been built as a landmark or beacon to assist travellers or encourage pilgrimage to Canterbury or Winchester Cathedrals.

Its current dedication to Saint Martha is one of only three in England: another example being St Martha's in Broxtowe near Nottingham. The third is a Methodist church in Tring, Hertfordshire. The church is floodlit during the Christmas season.

Concorde kneeler in St Martha's church

The graveyard of the church includes a memorial to actress and singer Yvonne Arnaud, whose ashes were scattered there. There is also the grave of Bernard Freyberg VC, which is in front of the south door of the church. Freyberg won his medal in 1916 as a Lieutenant-Colonel in The Royal West Surrey Regiment. He was a New Zealander who also won the DSO with three bars, and rose to the rank of Lieutenant-General. In 2007 a memorial service was held for him at the church, attended by the New Zealand High Commissioner. A regular member of the congregation in the 1970s was Sir George Edwards, chairman of the British Aircraft Corporation. He was a key figure in the development of Concorde. A kneeler in the church has a depiction of the aircraft.

The eastern end of St Martha's Hill is notified as part of Colyers Hanger Site of Special Scientific Interest (SSSI). This area was included in the SSSI for its heathland vegetation communities, including several characteristic acidic grassland plants. Other parts of the hill also have relict heathland vegetation.

The western end of St Martha's Hill is registered common land.

The hill reaches a height of 574 feet (175 m), making it the 18th highest in the county; as with most of the top 20 hills in Surrey, it is part of the slightly scattered Greensand Ridge.

Close to the foot of the hill is Chilworth Manor.
