= Bethel Chapel, Guildford =

Bethel Chapel
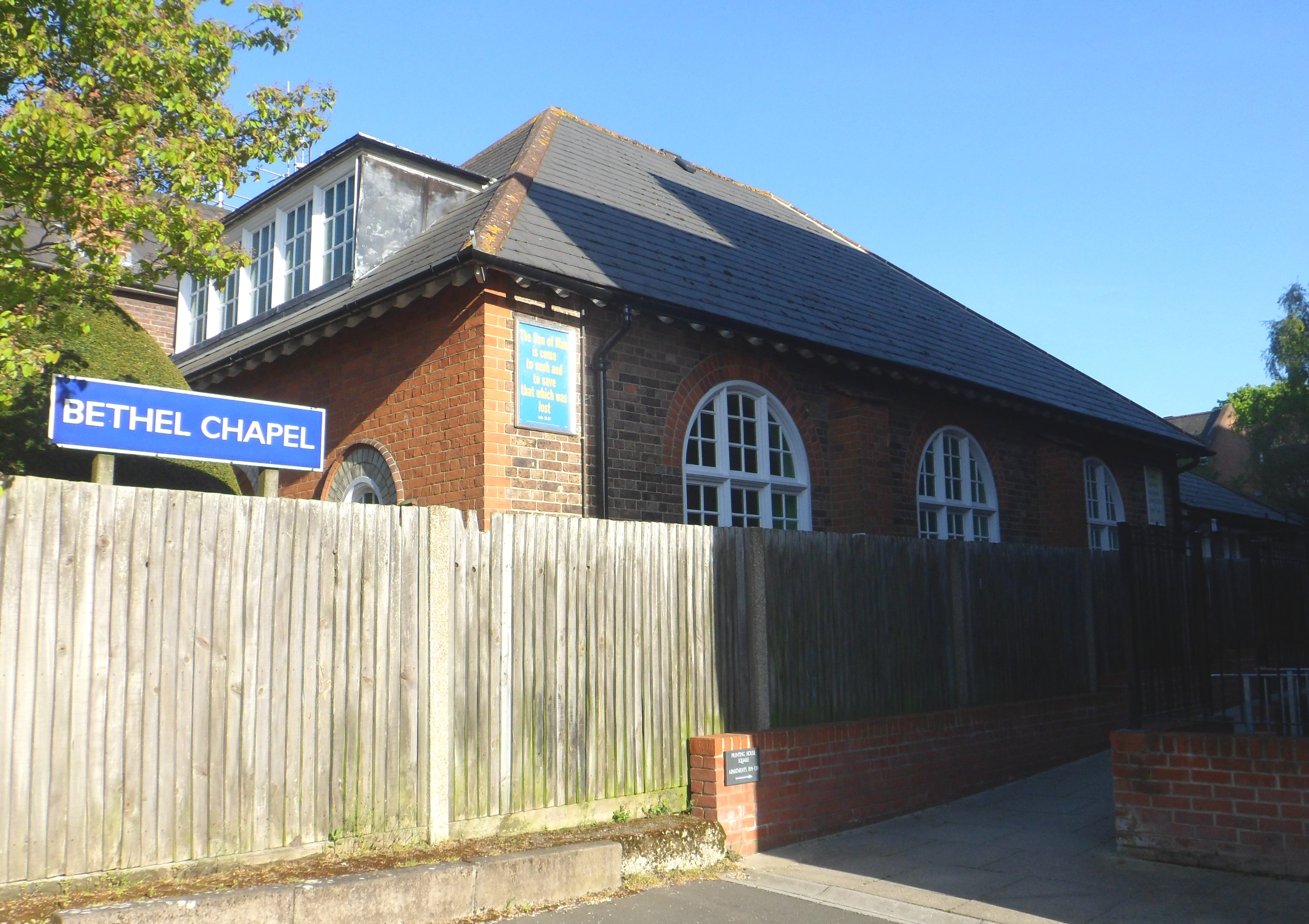
- The chapel from the northwest
- Bethel Chapel
- 51.2383°N 0.5718°W
- OS grid reference: SU 99797 49760
- Location: The Bars, Guildford, Surrey
- Country: England
- Denomination: Baptist
- Website: www.bethelchapelguildford.org

History
- Status: Baptist Church
- Founded: 14 April 1879

Architecture
- Functional status: Active
- Style: Vernacular
- Completed: June 1910

Bethel Chapel, The Bars, Guildford, is an independent reformed Baptist church located in the heart of the historic town of Guildford.

The Church was established in 1879 and the present building opened in 1910.

The congregation started in 1878 when a few people left the Old Baptist Chapel in Castle Street, dissatisfied with the liturgy there. They hired the basement hall in the Ward Street Halls to hold services in, and on 14 April 1879, a Church was formed on the basis of the Gospel Standard Articles of Faith.

A few months later the Church obtained a piece of land in nearby Martyr Road where they erected a temporary chapel built of corrugated iron and known as 'the Tin Chapel'. The name 'Bethel' was given to the building. Although several men who preached at the Tin Chapel were asked to become pastor, none of them accepted the call and the ministry was carried on by visiting preachers.

By the early years of the 20th century the church felt the need for a more permanent building. Land was purchased in The Bars, the next road north, where a new chapel was built in red brick with round-headed windows outlined in grey brick. The new Bethel was opened in June 1910, Mr. J.K. Popham of Brighton and Mr. Calcott of Coventry preached at the opening services. The old building was taken over by the Railway Mission.

Due to the enclosed nature of the site most light enters the chapel through a large dormer window above the front door. The whole building has a pleasing arts-and-crafts feeling about it. This building, with schoolroom, hall, vestry and toilets in a sympathetic extension added in 1930, is still in use. The original furnishings, pulpit, pews and so on are all still in place. Recently the dormer window in the front of the chapel has been repaired.

The first pastor of the Bethel was Jabez Wiltshire. Born into a Christian home at Studley in Wiltshire, he was brought into concern for his soul early in life. After conversion he was baptised at Zion Chapel in Trowbridge in April 1914 and began to preach in 1917. In 1925 Mr. Wiltshire accepted a call to the pastorate at Bethel, expressing a desire to remain in his post until death. He died on 12 June 1953, at the age of sixty-one. He left four children. There is a small memorial to Mr. Wiltshire in the chapel.

The second pastor at Bethel, Mr. P. Buss, served from 1981 to 1985.

On 1 January 2018 Mr James Taylor became the current pastor.
