= St Martha, Surrey =

Coordinates: 51.220°N 0.538°W

St Martha's
- Civil parish
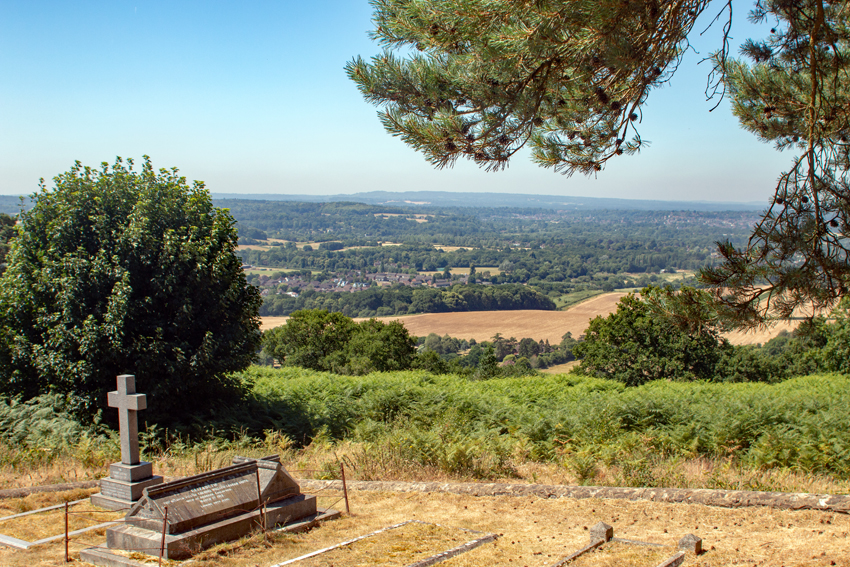
- Chilworth village viewed from St Martha's hill

- Location within Surrey
- Area: 3.44 km^{2} (1.33 sq mi)
- Population: 677 (Civil Parish)
  - Density: 197/km^{2} (510/sq mi)
- OS grid reference: TQ0248
- Civil parish: St Martha's
- District: Guildford
- Shire county: Surrey
- Region: South East
- Country: England
- Sovereign state: United Kingdom
- Post town: Guildford
- Postcode district: GU4
- Dialling code: 01483
- Police: Surrey
- Fire: Surrey
- Ambulance: South East Coast
- UK Parliament: Godalming and Ash

St Martha is a hillside, largely wooded, small civil parish in the Guildford borough of Surrey towards the narrower part of the west half of the North Downs. It includes three homes north of St Martha's Hill, a southern knoll of the range of hills but almost all its population is south of this, in much of the village of Chilworth which is divided between St Martha's and Shalford parishes. Chilworth gunpowder works mark the southern border of the entity, and are a well-preserved, publicly accessible area of riverside former industry.

== Local government ==
The chairman of the parish council is David Bunting.

== History ==
Of national importance in the heavily wooded valley floor where the Tillingbourne runs, is the former Gunpowder Works, a large Scheduled Ancient Monument, formed of scattered industrial remains. This was a major production centre, particularly in the Stuart period of gunpowder, first for the East India Company and later for the army and navy.

== Amenities ==
The principal amenities are those of Chilworth, half of which is in St Martha's. The 12th century church restored to its Norman state by Henry Woodyer is on a knoll above this – it remains as since the Middle Ages a spiritual sanctuary.

== Geography ==
The panorama above is viewed from St Martha's Hill over all of the south of the parish and beyond, it has a dense patch of woodland which obscure some of its homes however St Martha's ceases before the background rise, which is that of the start of the Greensand Ridge. The view and landscape resemble neighbouring Newlands Corner on the Downs.

The north of the parish is more heavily wooded and has three homes on a lane leading from Guildford, White Lane, the name reflecting the chalkiness of the road.

== Demography and housing ==
In 2001 it had a population of 667.

2011 Census Homes
Output area	Detached	Semi-detached	Terraced	Flats and apartments	Caravans/temporary/mobile homes	shared between households
(Civil Parish)	199	51	21	21	1	0

The average level of accommodation in the region composed of detached houses was 28%, the average that was apartments was 22.6%.

2011 Census Key Statistics
Output area	Population	Households	% Owned outright	% Owned with a loan	hectares
(Civil Parish)	677	293	57.7%	28.3%	344

The proportion of households in the civil parish who owned their home outright compares to the regional average of 35.1%. The proportion who owned their home with a loan compares to the regional average of 32.5%. The remaining % is made up of rented dwellings (plus a negligible % of households living rent-free).
