= Grade II* listed buildings in Guildford (borough) =

Borough of Guildford within Surrey

There are over 20,000 Grade II* listed buildings in England. This page is a list of the 42 Grade II* listed buildings in the district of Guildford; for similar pages in relation to the other 10 districts in Surrey see Grade II* listed buildings in Surrey.

Name	Location	Type	Completed (Note: The date given is the date used by Historic England as significant for the initial building or that of an important part in the structure's description.)	Date designated	Grid ref. (Note: Sometimes known as OSGB36, the grid reference is based on the British national grid reference system used by the Ordnance Survey.) Geo-coordinates	Entry number (Note: The "List Entry Number" is a unique number assigned to each listed building and scheduled monument by Historic England.)	Image
Albury Park	Albury Park, Albury	Country house	16th century	14 June 1967	TQ0639047700; 51°13′07″N 0°28′41″W	1029565	Albury Park More images
Ash Manor and Old Manor Cottage	Ash	Moated house	13th century	14 June 1967	SU9011850418; 51°14′45″N 0°42′37″W	1294794	Upload Photo
Bath House and Terrace to Albury House, Tunnel Entrance Bath House and Terraces	Albury Park, Albury	Bath House	1667-1676	14 June 1967	TQ0651447964; 51°13′15″N 0°28′34″W	1029566	Upload Photo
Catholic Apostolic Church and Chapterhouse	Albury Park, Albury	Church	1840	14 June 1967	TQ0603148144; 51°13′22″N 0°28′59″W	1029568	Catholic Apostolic Church and Chapterhouse More images
8 and 9 Littleton Lane	Artington	House	17th century	14 June 1967	SU9815547331; 51°13′00″N 0°35′46″W	1188281	8 and 9 Littleton Lane
Church of St Peter	Ash	Church	12th century	14 June 1967	SU8974750778; 51°14′57″N 0°42′56″W	1029647	Church of St Peter More images
Watts Gallery	Compton	House/Art Gallery	1903-4	4 June 1975	SU9584947807; 51°13′17″N 0°37′44″W	1188403	Watts Gallery More images
Church of St Martin	East Horsley	Church	12th century	14 June 1967	TQ0952452811; 51°15′50″N 0°25′54″W	1377815	Church of St Martin More images
Horsley Towers	East Horsley	Country house	1820-1829	14 June 1967	TQ0982552982; 51°15′56″N 0°25′38″W	1294810	Horsley Towers More images
Church of St Lawrence	Effingham	Church	12th century	14 June 1967	TQ1182953664; 51°16′16″N 0°23′54″W	1294793	Church of St Lawrence More images
Castle Arch	Guildford	House	1672	1 May 1953	SU9969549249; 51°14′01″N 0°34′24″W	1189846	Castle Arch More images
Cathedral Church of the Holy Spirit	Guildford	Anglican Cathedral	1936-1939	16 January 1981	SU9853850044; 51°14′28″N 0°35′23″W	1377883	Cathedral Church of the Holy Spirit More images
Church of St John the Evangelist	Guildford	Church	1858	1 May 1953	SU9982150725; 51°14′49″N 0°34′16″W	1294008	Church of St John the Evangelist More images
Church of St Nicholas	Guildford	Church	1875	1 May 1953	SU9941549346; 51°14′05″N 0°34′39″W	1029291	Church of St Nicholas More images
Lloyds Bank	Guildford	Bank	1765	1 May 1953	SU9979649503; 51°14′10″N 0°34′19″W	1029287	Lloyds Bank More images
The Angel Hotel	Guildford	House	19th century	1 May 1953	SU9966349457; 51°14′08″N 0°34′26″W	1029282	The Angel Hotel More images
The Treadwheel Crane	Guildford	Treadwheel Crane	Late C17/C18	1 May 1953	SU9943449434; 51°14′08″N 0°34′38″W	1377866	The Treadwheel Crane More images
72, 74, 76 and 78 High Street (one, 1803-built two-bay mid-terrace with 13th century Undercroft.)	Guildford	House	1803	1 May 1953	SU9967649432; 51°14′07″N 0°34′25″W	1180242	72, 74, 76 and 78 High Street (one, 1803-built two-bay mid-terrace with 13th century Undercroft.)
6 Quarry Street	Guildford	House	Late C17/Early 18th century	1 May 1953	SU9964549300; 51°14′03″N 0°34′27″W	1294017	6 Quarry Street
8 and 8a Quarry Street	Guildford	House	Late C17/Early 18th century	1 May 1953	SU9964849293; 51°14′03″N 0°34′27″W	1029224	8 and 8a Quarry Street
13 Quarry Street	Guildford	House	Late C13/C14	1 May 1953	SU9966149262; 51°14′02″N 0°34′26″W	1294022	13 Quarry Street
55 Quarry Street	Guildford	House	Pre 18th century	1 May 1953	SU9965649328; 51°14′04″N 0°34′26″W	1029216	55 Quarry Street
Norney Grange	Norney, Shackleford	House	1897	21 May 1985	SU9384044906; 51°11′44″N 0°39′30″W	1029515	Norney Grange
Stables to Ockham Park House	Ockham	Flats	Early 18th century	14 June 1967	TQ0653856551; 51°17′53″N 0°28′24″W	1188468	Stables to Ockham Park House
Church of St Michael and All Angels	Pirbright	Church	Rebuilt 1784	14 June 1967	SU9423055916; 51°17′41″N 0°39′00″W	1377714	Church of St Michael and All Angels More images
Church of St John the Baptist	Puttenham	Church	12th century	14 June 1967	SU9330847861; 51°13′20″N 0°39′55″W	1029601	Church of St John the Baptist More images
Puttenham Priory	Puttenham	Country house	1762	19 February 1957	SU9333447818; 51°13′19″N 0°39′54″W	1294505	Puttenham Priory More images
Church of St Mary the Virgin	Ripley	Church	C20	14 June 1967	TQ0512356634; 51°17′57″N 0°29′37″W	1188603	Church of St Mary the Virgin More images
The Talbot	Ripley	Restaurant	16th century	14 June 1967	TQ0541456877; 51°18′05″N 0°29′21″W	1029372	The Talbot More images
Church of St Mary	Send	Church	c. 1240	14 June 1967	TQ0186954343; 51°16′45″N 0°32′27″W	1188756	Church of St Mary More images
Unstead Bridge	Shalford	Bridge	13th century	14 June 1967	SU9931145435; 51°11′58″N 0°34′48″W	1029507	Upload Photo
Shalford Mill	Shalford	Watermill	Early 18th century	14 June 1967	TQ0010647635; 51°13′09″N 0°34′05″W	1294360	Shalford Mill More images
Unstead Manor	Shalford	Country house	16th century	14 June 1967	SU9940945442; 51°11′58″N 0°34′43″W	1294317	Upload Photo
Fulvens House	Shere	House	c. 1620	14 June 1967	TQ0977046413; 51°12′23″N 0°25′48″W	1294281	Fulvens House
Old Hatch Farm House	Shere	House	Late 19th century	14 June 1967	TQ0939447627; 51°13′03″N 0°26′06″W	1377801	Old Hatch Farm House More images
Usherwood	Shere	Bungalow	Built 1934-36	17 October 2008	TQ0997645397; 51°11′50″N 0°25′39″W	1392952	Upload Photo
Barn, 80 Yards West of Church of St Bartholomew	Wanborough	Barn	17th century	14 June 1967	SU9342948893; 51°13′54″N 0°39′48″W	1029613	Barn, 80 Yards West of Church of St Bartholomew More images
Greyfriars	Wanborough	House	1896	13 December 1984	SU9459748313; 51°13′34″N 0°38′48″W	1029612	Greyfriars More images
Church of St Peter and St Paul	West Clandon	Church	Late 12th century	14 June 1967	TQ0441851250; 51°15′03″N 0°30′19″W	1029360	Church of St Peter and St Paul More images
Lodges and Gates to Clandon House	West Clandon	Gate	Early 18th century	14 June 1967	TQ0305950832; 51°14′50″N 0°31′29″W	1188805	Lodges and Gates to Clandon House More images
Foxwarren Park	Wisley	Country House	1860	22 September 1981	TQ0794259972; 51°19′43″N 0°27′08″W	1189110	Foxwarren Park More images
Littlefield Manor	Worplesdon	House	Late 17th century	14 June 1967	SU9587152099; 51°15′36″N 0°37′39″W	1191554	Littlefield Manor More images
