= Ashford =

Ashford may refer to:

== Places ==
=== Australia ===
- Ashford, New South Wales
- Ashford, South Australia
- Electoral district of Ashford, South Australia

=== Ireland ===
- Ashford, County Wicklow
- Ashford Castle, County Galway

=== United Kingdom ===
- Ashford, Kent, a town
  - Borough of Ashford, a local government district in Kent
  - Ashford (UK Parliament constituency), Kent
  - Ashford International railway station
- Ashford, North Devon, near Barnstaple (a civil parish)
- Ashford, South Hams, Devon, near Kingsbridge, in Aveton Gifford parish
- Ashford, Surrey (formerly Middlesex)
- Ashford Hill, Hampshire
- Ashford-in-the-Water, Derbyshire
- Ashford Bowdler, Shropshire
- Ashford Carbonell, Shropshire

=== United States ===
- Ashford, Alabama
- Ashford Mill, California
- Ashford, Connecticut
- Ashford, New York
- Ashford, Texas
- Ashford, Washington
- Ashford, Wisconsin, a town
  - Ashford (community), Wisconsin, an unincorporated community
- Ashford, Richland County, Wisconsin, a ghost town
- Ashford University, Clinton, Iowa

== Other uses ==
- Ashford (surname)
- ST Ashford, a tugboat
