= Martin "Ash" Ashford =

Martin "Ash" Ashford may refer to:

- Martin "Ash" Ashford (Casualty), a fictional character on the television series Casualty
- Martin Ashford (Home and Away), a fictional character on the television series Home and Away

== See also ==
- Martin Ashford (disambiguation)
- Ashford (surname)
