= Listed buildings in Ashford Bowdler =

Ashford Bowdler is a civil parish in Shropshire, England. It contains 22 listed buildings that are recorded in the National Heritage List for England. Of these, two are listed at Grade II*, the middle grade of the three grades, and the others are at Grade II, the lowest grade. The parish contains the village of Ashford Bowdler and the surrounding countryside. Most of the listed buildings are in the village, and consist of a church and items in the churchyard, houses, cottages, farmhouses, and farm buildings. Outside the village, the most important building is a country house, Ashford Hall; the hall and some associated structures are listed. The other listed buildings are a road bridge, a milepost, and a railway bridge.

== Key ==
Grade	Criteria
II*	Particularly important buildings of more than special interest
II	Buildings of national importance and special interest

== Buildings ==
Name and location	Photograph	Date	Notes	Grade
St Andrew's Church; 52.33092°N 2.70669°W		12th century	The church was extended in the 15th century, restored in 1846 and 1904, and the chancel was rebuilt in 1907. It is in sandstone and has a slate roof, and verges with bargeboards. The church consists of a nave, a south porch, and a short chancel with a north vestry. Incorporated into the west end of the nave is a turret with a broach spire, both covered with shingles. In the north and south walls of the nave are blocked Norman doorways. The rebuilding of the chancel incorporated two Norman windows and the Decorated east window, consisting of three lancets and a rose window above.	II*
Spring Cottage; 52.33179°N 2.70831°W	—	c. 1583	The house was extended to the rear in the 17th century. It was originally two houses, and later combined into one. The house is timber framed on a stone plinth with brick infill and a thatched roof. It has a single storey with an attic, a front of three bays, and a rear wing. The windows are casements, those in the attic in eyebrow eaves. At the rear is a flat-roofed dormer.	II
Grove Farmhouse; 52.33183°N 2.71007°W		Late 16th or early 17th century	The farmhouse is in three parts, all with tiled roofs. The oldest part to the east is timber framed with rendered infill on a stone plinth. Brick cross-wings were added in the 18th century. It has two storeys, and the wings also have cellars and attics. There is one mullioned and transomed window, and the other windows are casements. The other parts are in brick with dentilled eaves. The central part has two storeys, sash windows, and a gabled porch. The main range to the west, dating from the 18th century, has three storeys and cellars, a hipped roof, and three bays. In the centre is a semicircular flat-roofed porch that has a doorway with pilasters, a fanlight, and an entablature. The ground floor contains two Venetian windows, and the other windows are sashes.	II
No. 6 Ashford Bowdler; 52.33174°N 2.70846°W	—	17th century	The house is attached to Spring Cottage, and was extended in the 20th century. It is timber framed with brick infill and has a thatched roof; the extension is in brick. There is one storey and an attic, and three bays. On the front is a thatched and glazed porch, and the windows are casements, those in the attic in eyebrow eaves.	II
No. 7 Ashford Bowdler; 52.33152°N 2.70808°W		17th century	The house is timber framed on a stone plinth with brick infill and a thatched roof. It has a single storey with an attic, and two bays with later extensions at each end. On the front is a gabled porch, and the windows are casements, those in the attic in eyebrow eaves.	II
Linden Lea; 52.33140°N 2.70801°W		17th century	Originally two houses, it was extended in the 20th century, and combined into one dwelling. Both parts have a single storey and an attic. The original part is timber framed with rendered infill and a thatched roof. It has casement windows and a gabled dormer. The extension to the left is in rendered brick and has a tiled roof.	II
Manor House; 52.33129°N 2.70987°W	—	17th century	The oldest part of the house is the cross-wing, the main range being built later in the 17th century. The house is in brick, the cross-wing has a tiled roof, and the main range has dentil eaves and a slate roof with coped gables. The main range has three storeys and three bays, sash windows with segmental heads in the lower two floors, and casement windows with flat heads in the top floor. The doorway in the left bay has a half-hipped tiled canopy on brackets. The cross-wing has two storeys, cellars and an attic, and three bays. some windows are mullioned, and others are sashes.	II
Old Yew Tree Farmhouse; 52.33136°N 2.71087°W		17th century	The farmhouse was extended with the addition of a main range in the 18th century. The original range is timber framed with brick infill on a stone plinth, and with brick at the rear. There are two storeys, the upper floor jettied, and it contains casement windows. Behind is a brick wing with a single storey and an attic, a lean-to porch, and a gabled dormer. The main range, further to the rear, is in brick with two storeys and an undercroft, and casement windows. All the roofs are tiled.	II
Group of five memorials 52.33091°N 2.70655°W	—	Early 18th century	This consists of a group of five headstones in the churchyard of St Andrew's Church, some set vertically, others horizontally. They have various inscriptions and decorations, and carry dates in the 18th century.	II
The Old Vicarage; 52.33193°N 2.70817°W		Early 18th century	The vicarage, later a private house, was extended with a rear wing later in the 18th century. The house has two storeys and a tiled roof that has gables with ornamental bargeboards and finials. The original range, facing south, has three bays, the left two bays timber framed, and the right bay in brick. There is a gabled porch, and the windows are sashes, those in the ground floor with segmental heads. The rear wing is in stone, with casement windows, and a doorway with moulded pilasters and an open pediment. Running south from the house is a stone wall with flat sandstone coping.	II
Memorial to Samuel Cheese; 52.33082°N 2.70649°W	—	Early to mid 18th century	The memorial in the churchyard of St Andrew's Church is to the memory of Samuel Cheese and his wife. It consists of an ashlar headstone with a double inscribed panel. Above each panel is a carved head.	II
Outbuilding, Grove Farm; 52.33168°N 2.71041°W	—	18th century	The outbuilding is in brick with dentil eaves and a hipped tile roof. There are two storeys and a T-shaped plan, with a three-bay range and a cross-wing to the right. It contains a cart entrance with a segmental head, doorways, pitching holes and other openings.	II
Ashford Hall; 52.33624°N 2.71542°W	—	c. 1760	A country house that was extended in 1771, it is in brick with a modillioned cornice, a parapet, and a hipped slate roof. There are three storeys and an attic, a front of seven bays, and a long rear extension. The middle three bays project under a pediment with a modillioned apex. There is a central portico with Doric columns, pilasters, an entablature, and an open pediment. The left return has four bays, and contains a bay window. The windows are sashes.	II*
Stable block, The Rhyse and wall, Ashford Hall; 52.33585°N 2.71586°W	—	Mid to late 18th century	The stable block was extended in the 19th century and converted into a house and a store in the 20th century. This forms an L-shaped plan with the south wing being the house and the east wing the store. They are in brick with hipped tile roofs and two storeys. The house has a modillioned cornice and a parapet, a front of five bays, casement windows, and a canopy with a hipped tile roof. The store has five bays, the middle three bays projecting under a pediment containing a clock face. The windows are mullioned or mullioned and transomed. In the centre of the roof is a bell turret with an open octagonal arcade on a plinth, with a lead cupola roof, a weathervane, and a ball finial. Attached is a brick wall with gate piers that have pyramidal caps.	II
Barn and outbuildings, Rhyse Farm; 52.33535°N 2.71586°W		c. 1771–91	The barn and outbuilding are at right angles, forming an L-shaped plan. They are in brick, the barn has a hipped slate roof, and the outbuilding has a tiled roof. The barn has dentil eaves, segmental-headed openings, and cross-shaped ventilation holes.	II
Walls, gates, greenhouse, and boiler house, Ashford Hall; 52.33574°N 2.71697°W	—	Late 18th century	The walls surround the kitchen garden, they are in brick, and have coping partly in ashlar and partly in tile. There are three doorways with segmental arches. At the northwest are brick piers with pyramidal caps and moulded soffits. On the north wall is a twelve-bay greenhouse on a brick plinth, and on the other side of the wall is a brick boiler house with a tiled roof.	II
Memorial to William Wordsworth; 52.33086°N 2.70675°W	—	Late 18th century	The memorial is in the churchyard of St Andrew's Church, and consists of an ashlar chest tomb on a red brick plinth. It has a plain lid with a moulded border.	II
Church House; 52.33089°N 2.70726°W		c. 1785	A brick house in late Georgian style, with a hipped slate roof, it consists of a rectangular block with two rear service wings. The main block has three storeys and the wings have two storeys. The front has three bays, and a central doorway with a four-centred arched head. The windows are sashes with fluted architraves, cornices and stone sills. In the left return is a two-storey semicircular bay window with a conical roof.	II
Ashford Bridge; 52.33594°N 2.70577°W		1797	The bridge carries a road over the River Teme. It was designed by Thomas Telford, and is built in stone with brick parapets and piers. The bridge consists of a single segmental arch with a span of 25 metres (82 ft). It has voussoirs, a string course, and buttresses at the abutment. The road approaches on each side are on causeways with round arches.	II
Memorial to Elizabeth Bright; 52.33084°N 2.70651°W	—	Early 19th century	The memorial is in the churchyard of St Andrew's Church, and consists of an ashlar chest tomb on a chamfered plinth. It has a plain flat lid, plain inscribed side panels, and corner piers.	II
Milepost; 52.33908°N 2.71288°W	—	Early 19th century	The milepost is in the east side of the B4361 road. It is in cast iron and has a support post, twin angled destination name plates, and a sloping connecting top plate. The top plate is inscribed "ASHFORD PARISH" and the destination plates indicate the distances in miles to Ludlow, "TENBURY" (Tenbury Wells), and "LEMSTER" (Leominster).	II
Railway bridge 52.32909°N 2.70861°W	—	1866	A girder bridge carrying a farm track over the railway, it is in steel and cast iron with brick piers. There are splayed approach and retaining walls, and end piers with pyramidal coping. The girders are in steel, and there is a cast iron balustrade.	II
