= Blakeney Guildhall =

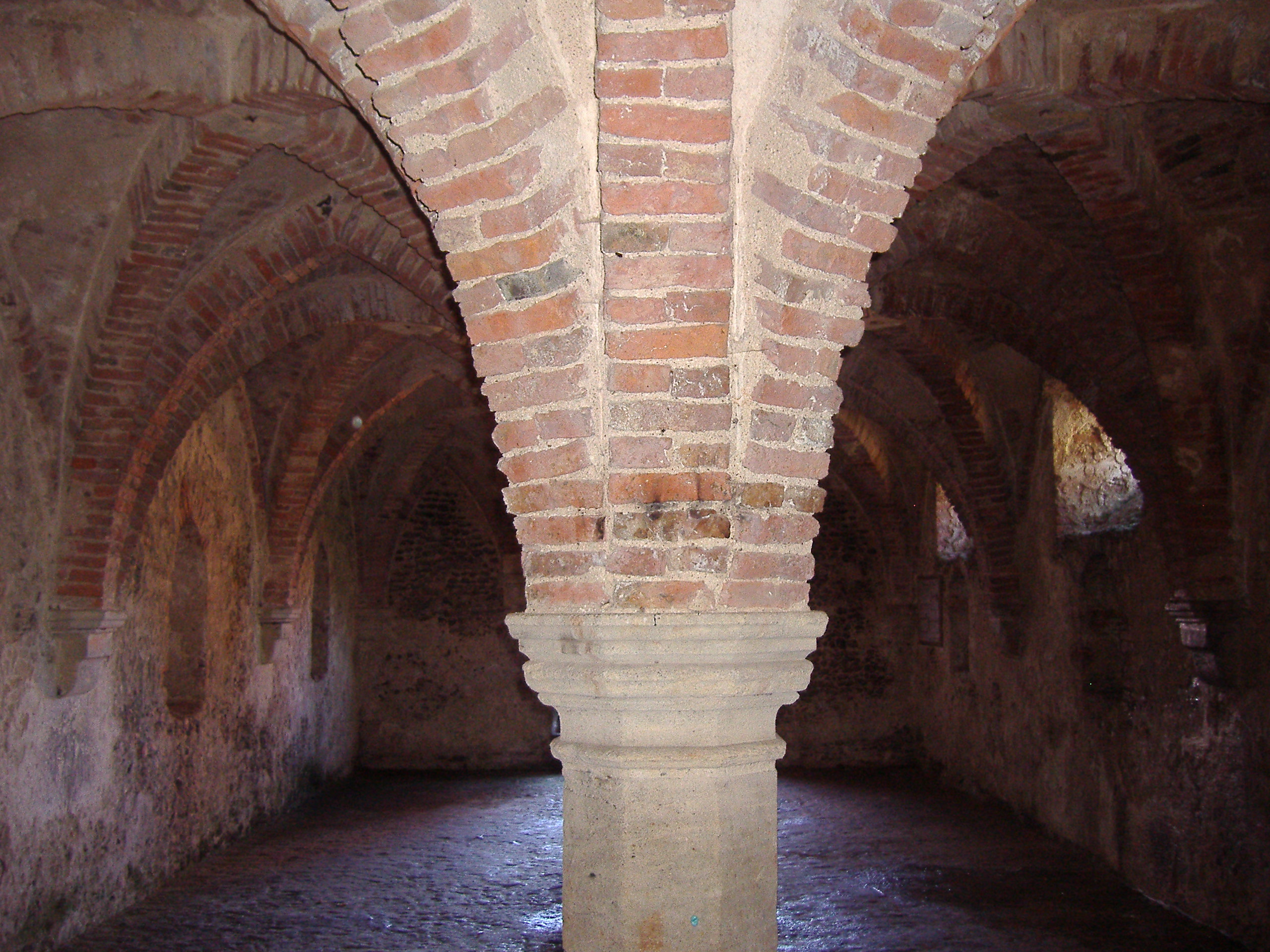
- The undercroft of Blakeney Guildhall

- Location in Norfolk
- 52.9557°N 1.0179°E
- Location: Blakeney, Norfolk

History
- Built: 14th century

Scheduled monument
- Official name: Medieval undercroft known as the Guildhall
- Designated: 26 June 1924
- Reference no.: 1014237

Listed Building – Grade II*
- Official name: Guildhall
- Designated: 6 March 1959
- Reference no.: 1373987

Blakeney Guildhall is a building in the coastal village of Blakeney in the north of the county of Norfolk. The property is in the care of English Heritage but is managed by the local parish council. Blakeney is just off the A149 coast road and is nine miles west of Sheringham. The property can be found in an alley just off the quay. It is a scheduled monument.

== Origins ==
The building has always traditionally been called the Guildhall but nothing is known of its early history. It is likely to have originally been built for a prosperous medieval Blakeney fish merchant, the undercroft being used for storage of his merchandise. The building later became the guildhall of Blakeney's guild of fish merchants. The Guildhall was once a two-storey building but now all that remains is the 14th-century brick-vaulted undercroft. It is divided into two aisles by a row of stone piers which support the ribbed vaults of brickwork. The doorway and the windows are all original. The bricks, no doubt, were locally made and are typical of their period, being of variable shape, quality and appearance. For this reason brickwork of this period was often plastered over. The main building was entered from higher ground on the southern land side of the building. A projection at the south-east corner contains the shute that served a garderobe or privy.

== Ownership ==
It is believed that the Guildhall was once owned by the Carmelite Friary that stood nearby. It has been in the ownership of the village for over 400 years. There is a series of deeds recording the transfer of ownership from one group of trustees to the next. Each deed provides for the Guildhall to be used for the benefit of the villagers of Blakeney. The first surviving deed dates from 1627. There are other similar deeds dated 1687, 1750 and 1808. Subsequent deeds do not appear to have survived. Over the years the basement has been used for the storage of cargo, as a grain store, coal bunker, for growing mushrooms and also a worm and bait store for local fishermen. During the war years the basement was used as a mortuary for drowned sailors.

== Gallery ==
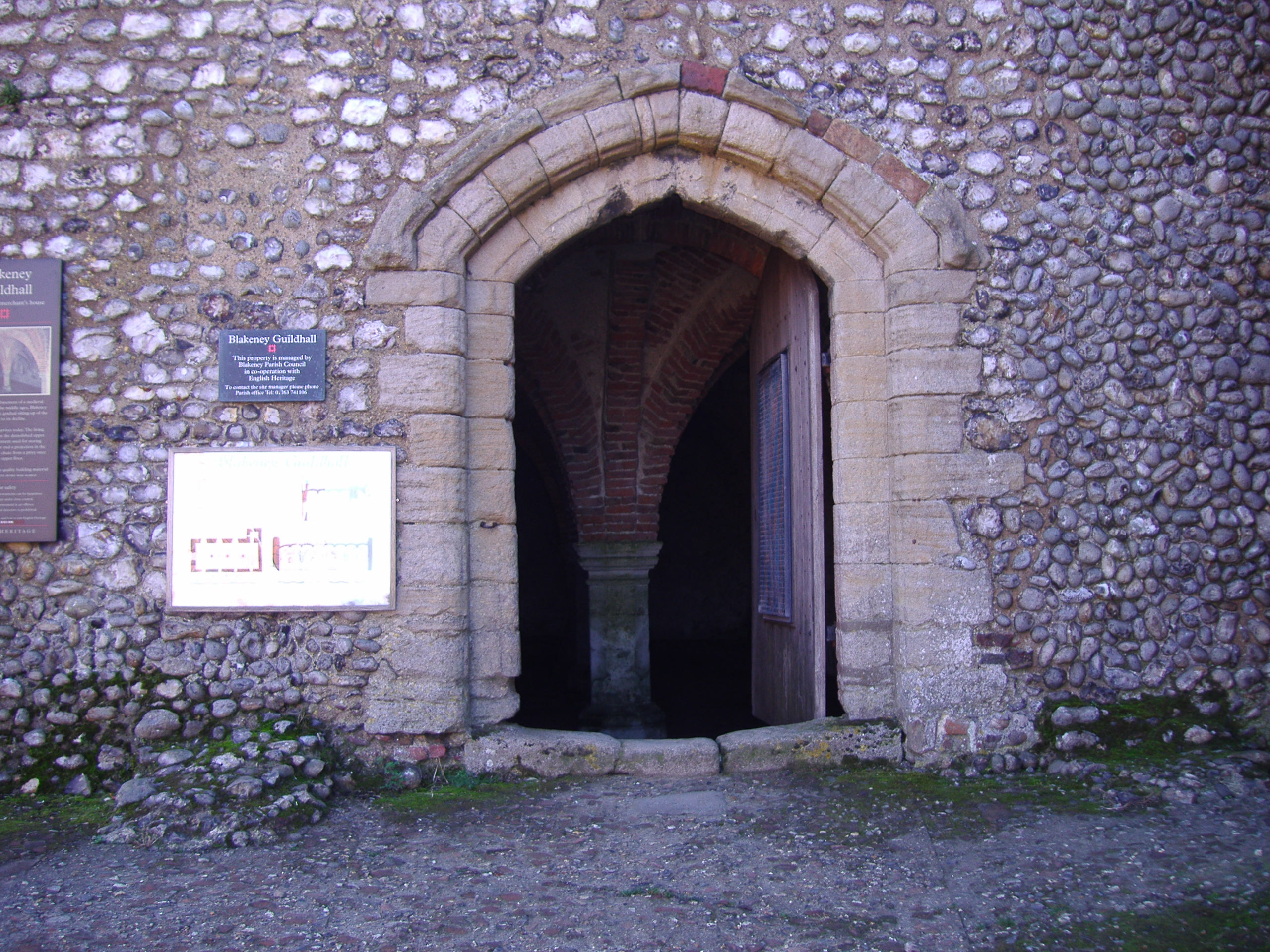
The entrance to Blakeney Guildhall

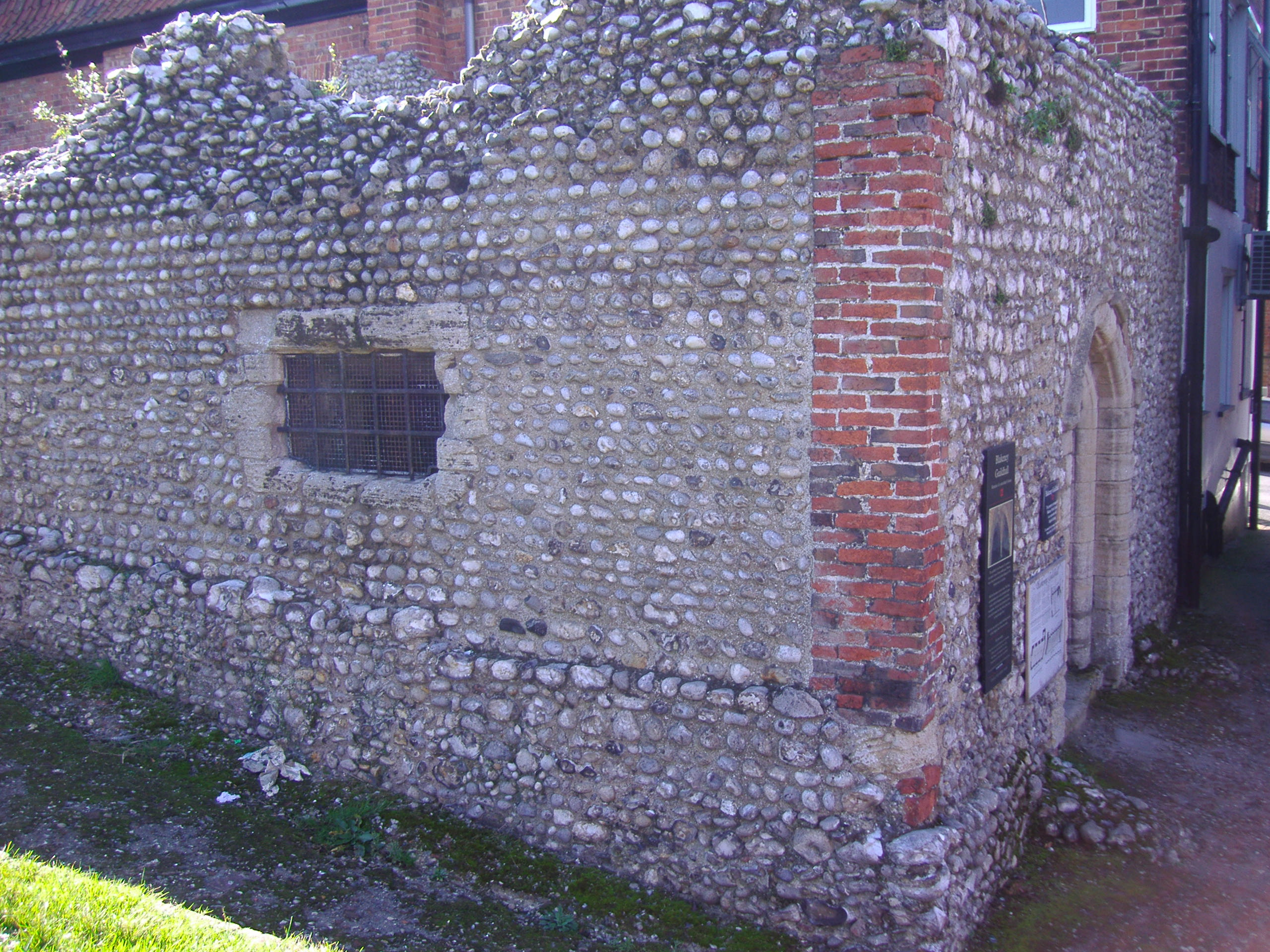
Remains of the outside of the Guildhall (2007)

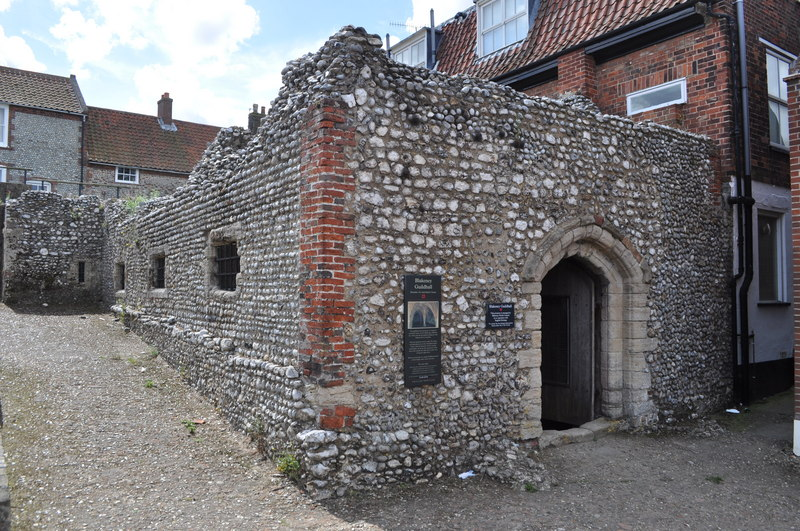
Guildhall (2010)

== See also ==
- Guild
- Guildhall Museum
