= Guildford Museum =

Local museum in Guildford, England

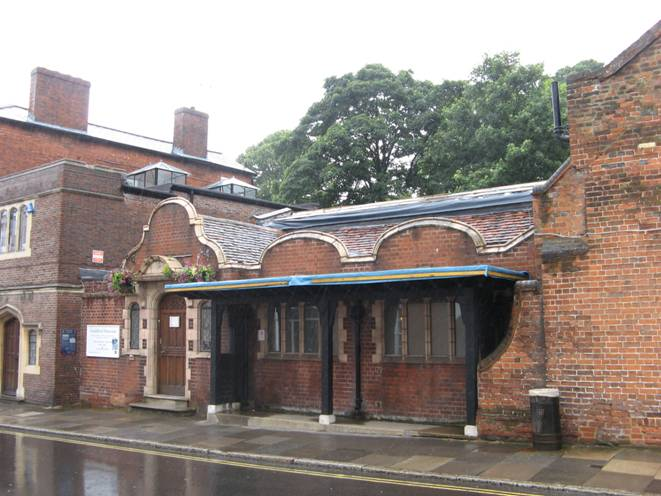
- Guildford Museum Quarry Street Entrance

- Location within Surrey
- 51°14′02″N 0°34′25″W
- Location: Quarry Street, Guildford, Surrey
- OS grid reference: SU 99695 49249

Site notes
- Governing body: Guildford Museums
- Owner: Guildford Borough Council

Listed Building – Grade II*
- Official name: Castle Arch
- Designated: 1 May 1953
- Reference no.: 1189846

Listed Building – Grade II*
- Official name: The Castle Gateway
- Designated: 1 May 1953
- Reference no.: 1029253

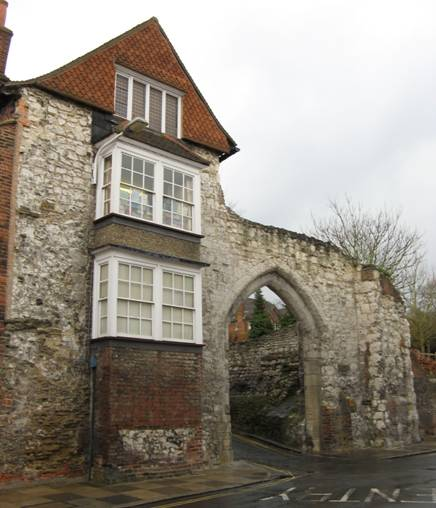
Guildford Museum Castle Arch

Guildford Museum is the main museum in the town of Guildford, Surrey, England. The museum is on Quarry Street, a narrow road lined by pre-1900 cottages running just off the pedestrianised High Street. This main site of the museum forms the gatehouse and annex of Guildford Castle, which the staff help to run. It is run by Guildford Borough Council and has free entry between 11am and 4:45pm on Monday to Saturday. It is closed on Sundays and on Christmas Day.

== History ==
The Museum's collection originally grew from the collections of the Surrey Archaeological Society, founded in 1854. From the outset the Society collected objects from excavations and private donations, as well as accepting loans from private individuals. These artefacts were first stored with the society's various Honorary Secretaries in a number of locations in London. In 1871 it was suggested that the Society's collections be moved to a more permanent base in Croydon (then Surrey, now a part of Greater London) and housed by the Croydon Literary and Scientific Institute. Part of the attraction of the move was that the Institute offered free accommodation for the collection, provided glass cases for display and offered to produce a catalogue of the collection. These terms were described as "very advantageous" by the Society's committee.

However, the Institute failed to live up to its promise to provide adequate care for the collections, and when the Honorary Secretary, Mill Stephenson, visited the collection in 1892 he found it in a "deplorable condition". Glass cases were smashed, locks were broken and objects were damaged or even missing. The Secretary remonstrated with the institute's librarian/curator and seems to have been unsurprised when the Society was asked to vacate the premises. The Society now had to look for new premises for their collection, and this was duly offered by Guildford Borough Council, who in 1885 had purchased Guildford Castle and its grounds, and opened them up as a public park and bowling green. The grounds included a row of cottages built on the site of the castle's old gatehouse. These cottages were offered to the Archaeological Society in 1898 (once the original tenants have moved out) for a new museum and library, with an annual rent of £12 pa. As part of the arrangement the Society agreed to open the museum to the public on at least one afternoon a week.

In 1903 Fredrick H. Elsley was appointed joint Librarian and Curator of the Society's collection of books, manuscripts and artefacts. He was offered an annual honorarium of £5 per year, which by the time of his death in 1944 had risen to £25 per year.

In 1912 the Museum, now being funded jointly by the Society and Borough Council, became known as "The Guildford Borough and Surrey Archaeological Society Museum". Free public entry was now offered on three afternoons a week. In 1933 the Council took over the full running of the Museum, with the Society's collection on near-permanent loan.

In June 2009 the Museum and local publicly sponsored Art Gallery merged.

== Collections ==
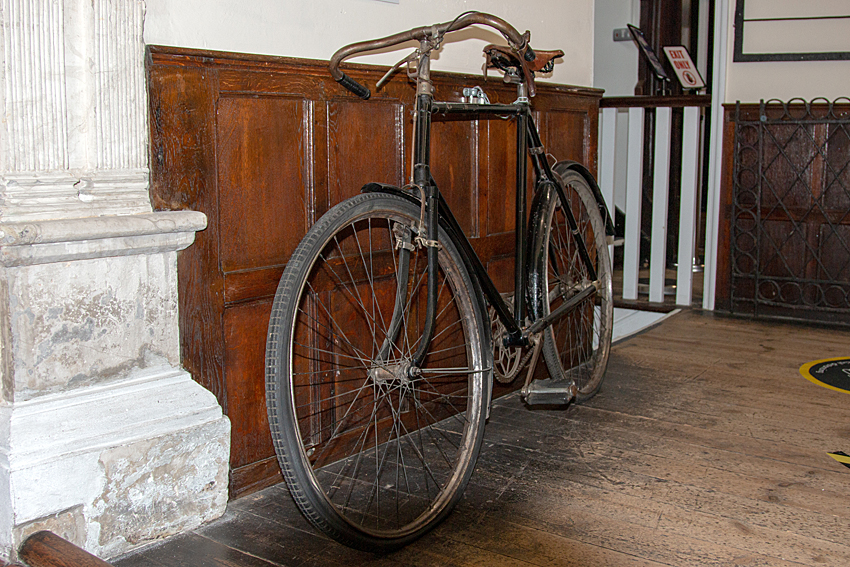
Dennis Brothers Speed King bike

Guildford Museum cares for over 75,000 objects, dating from c.500,000 BC (the Lower Palaeolithic) to the modern day. The Museum's collection contains objects either from, or in some way related to, Guildford, and to a lesser extent Surrey. The Museum's current collection policy means that it would be unlikely to accept objects from outside this area.

The collections can be sub-divided into four sections:

Archaeology The Museum's archaeology collection dates back to 1854, when the Surrey Archaeological Society was founded and began collecting objects, although few have in fact been in the collection for more than 100 years. Many of the objects in the collections remain on near-permanent loan from the Society. Highlights include sceptre handles and religious headdresses’ from the Romano-British temple site at Wanborough, a large collection of Mesolithic handaxes from Farnham, and the full excavation assemblage from the Tudor site of Farnborough Hill Convent, which was published by the Museum under the title Pots and Potters in Tudor Hampshire.

A minority of the 6,705 coins of the Reigate hoard are here found in 1990 at which time it was the largest post-1351 medieval coin hoard on record. This was entirely silver, bar 138 gold coins and dated from 1272 to 1455 (as did the 1972 Reigate hoard) and contained gold nobles, half-nobles and quarters and silver groats, half-groats and pennies, some Scottish and French coins, and a few of eight other countries.

Local History The local history collection dates from 1905 when the Museum began to collect social history objects. In 1907 it accepted a donation from Gertrude Jekyll, the celebrated garden designer, of her entire collection of objects relating to "Old Surrey". Much of this donation is still on display. Highlights include a napkin featuring an embroidered portrait of Elizabeth I (believed to have been used by her), fragments of a Zeppelin bomb dropped on the St Catherine's area of Guildford in World War I, and a green velvet suit purchased in Carnaby Street, London, in the 1970s.

Needlework The Museum also cares for a specialist needlework collection, highlights of which include 18th and 19th century samplers, a "lending quilt" from a local parish church and a wide selection of Surrey Smocks (smocks worn by farm labourers in the 17th, 18th and 19th centuries).

Art As a result of a merger between Guildford Museum and Guildford House Art Gallery (in June 2009), staff at the museum care for Guildford Borough Council's art collection, which includes a number of works by Guildford-born artist John Russell.

== Location and building ==
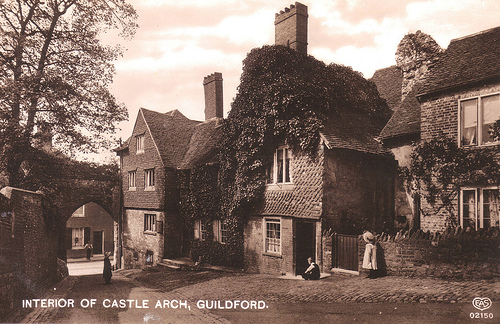
Castle Arch in the 19th Century

Guildford Museum is on two streets including Quarry Street, Guildford, almost opposite St Mary's Church, the oldest surviving building in the town (c. the year 1000). The first building occupied on the site was Castle Arch (whose foundations incorporate the gatehouse to Guildford Castle), which the Museum moved into in 1898. This building was enlarged in 1911, when an extension was built in the Castle Arch gardens to house the Gertrude Jekyll Old Surrey Life collection of artefacts which helped to inspire her lifetime collaborator architect Edwin Lutyens. The Museum was again extended in 1927 when the Borough Council purchased 48 Quarry Street, a 19th-century town house, and offered to convert the building and land adjacent to it into a muniment room for the Archaeological Society's archival collections.

== Other sites managed by the Museum ==
The Museum's teams manage:

- Guildford Castle
- The Undercroft, a medieval undercroft on Guildford High Street
- The medieval Great Barn at Wanborough
- Victorian School Room adjacent to the Museum.

== Exhibitions ==
The Museum hosts a programme of constantly changing temporary exhibitions on site. Recent exhibitions include "Hidden House Histories", detailing the history of objects hidden in houses as a form of superstition, and "The Women's Royal Army Corps in Guildford", which covered the time the WRAC was headquartered in Guildford (1949–1992).

A previous exhibition, entitled "A Few of My Favourite Things", featured objects chosen by local people from the Museum's reserve collections. Guest curators include Anne Milton MP, Bishop of Guildford Christopher Hill and High Sheriff of Surrey, Elizabeth Toulson. Objects on display include a 400,000-year-old hand axe from Swanscombe in Kent, and a napkin used by Queen Elizabeth I which features her embroidered portrait and an image of St George slaying the Dragon.

== Public services ==
Entrance to the museum is free including its collections not on display (usually by appointment). The Museum offers a finds identification service to members of the public who bring in an object to be identified and a school loans box service for schools and other groups eager to use objects during lessons, meetings, etc. A Victorian schoolroom adjacent to the museum offers a Victorian teaching experience for school children aged 6–12. Museum staff can also be booked to give talks on Guildford and Surrey History.

== See also ==
- Surrey Archaeological Society
- Surrey History Centre
