= Ashford (surname) =

Ashford is an English habitational surname from any of several places called Ashford. Those in Essex, Devon, Derbyshire, Shropshire and Kent are named from Old English æsc ‘ash’ + ford ‘ford’.

One in Surrey is first recorded in 969 as Ecelesford, probably from a personal name Eccel, a diminutive of ecca ‘edge (of a sword)’ + ford. The one in Kent is from æscet ‘clump of ash trees’ + ford.

Notable people with the surname include:

- Agnes Ashford (fl. 15th century), Christian evangelist
- Alan Ashford (born 1944), English cricketer
- Annaleigh Ashford (born 1985), American actress
- Bailey Ashford (1873–1934), American tropical medicine physician
- Brad Ashford (1949–2022), American politician
- Christopher Ashford or Chris Champion (1961–2018), English professional wrestler
- Daisy Ashford (1881–1972), writer
- Daniel F. Ashford (1879–1929), American politician from Louisiana
- David Ashford (born 1977), Isle of Man politician
- Emmett Ashford (1914–1980), Major League Baseball umpire
- Evelyn Ashford (born 1957), American track and field athlete
- Frederick Ashford (1886–1965), English athlete
- John Ashford (1944–2023), British theatre director
- Lindsay Ashford (born 1959), British crime writer
- Mary Ashford (died 1817), English murder victim whose brother engaged in a private prosecution of her murderer in Ashford v Thornton
- Matthew Ashford (born 1960), American actor
- Michelle Ashford (born 1960), American screenwriter and film producer
- Nellie Ashford (born 1943), American visual artist
- Nickolas Ashford (1941–2011), American singer, songwriter and producer
- Rob Ashford (born 1959), American stage director and choreographer
- Robert Ashford, American law professor
- Rosalind Ashford (born 1943), American singer with Martha and the Vandellas
- Ryan Ashford (born 1981), English footballer
- Thomas Ashford (1859–1913), English recipient of the Victoria Cross
- Tucker Ashford (born 1954), American baseball player
- Volney Ashford (1907–1973), American football coach
- William Ashford (1746–1824), English painter
- William George Ashford (1874–1925), Australian politician

== Fictional characters ==
- Alfred, Alexia and Alexander Ashford in the video game Resident Evil – Code: Veronica
- Angela Ashford, in the Resident Evil movie series
- Milly Ashford, in Sunrise's anime Code Geass
- Klaes Ashford, Belter pirate and captain of the OPAS Behemoth in The Expanse

== See also ==
- Ayshford (name)
