= Ayshford (name) =

Ayshford is a surname that has also been used as a middle name. Notable people with this name include:

== Surname ==
- Blake Ayshford (born 1988), Australian rugby league footballer
- Bruce Ayshford (born 1948), Australian rugby league footballer

== Given name ==
- Paul Ayshford Methuen, 4th Baron Methuen (1886–1974), British painter, zoologist and landowner
- Edward Ayshford Sanford (1794–1871), British politician
- William Ayshford Sanford (1818–1902), British landowner, naturalist and politician
- John Ayshford Wise (1810–1865), British politician

== See also ==
- Ayshford, a hamlet in Devon, England
- Ashford (surname)
