= Ashford, North Devon =

Village in Devon, England

Coordinates: 51.09°N 04.10°W

- Location within Devon
- OS grid reference: SS5335
- Shire county: Devon
- Region: South West
- Country: England
- Sovereign state: United Kingdom
- Post town: Barnstaple
- Postcode district: EX31
- Police: Devon and Cornwall
- Fire: Devon and Somerset
- Ambulance: South Western
- UK Parliament: North Devon

Ashford is a village and civil parish in the North Devon district of Devon, England. According to the 2011 census it had a population of 267.

This Ashford has a different origin to other place-names called Ashford, the origin being "ash-tree enclosure" Old English æsc "ash tree" and worō / worth "enclosure". The name was recorded as Aiscawurde in 1182.

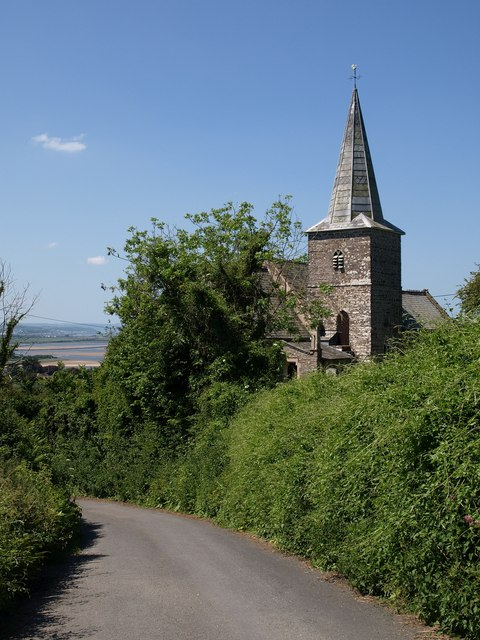
St Peter's Church

The parish church of St Peter is a grade II* listed building. The tower was rebuilt in 1798 and the remainder in 1854.
