= Nellie Ashford =

American visual and folk artist

Nellie Ashford (born c. 1943) is a self-taught folk artist from Mecklenburg County, North Carolina. Her mixed-media folk art depicts the experiences of Charlotte’s African-American community from the Jim Crow era to contemporary day in the U.S. South.

== Early life and education ==
Ashford grew up in a rural part of Mecklenburg County and attended school in a segregated four-room schoolhouse. She later graduated from Plato Price High School and earned a Bachelor's degree in psychology and social science from Shaw University. She is self-trained as an artist.

== Career ==
Her work has been featured in a number of special exhibits since at least the early 2000s. She participated in a 2004 juried art show for the Afro-American Cultural Center in Charlotte, North Carolina, for which she earned the curator's recognition award. In 2010, her show "Nellie's People" was featured at the Delta Arts Center in Winston-Salem, North Carolina. In 2013, her work was displayed at the Gaston County Museum in Dallas, North Carolina. The Harvey B. Gantt Center for African American Arts+Culture hosted her first major-museum, solo exhibit in 2016. According to the Gantt Center, the solo exhibit, titled "Nellie Ashford: Through My Eyes," communicates "cultural identity, shared community values and aesthetics."

During the 2012 U.S. Presidential election campaign, 11 of her works were featured at the Democratic National Convention Committee headquarters in Charlotte.

In 2020, the Arts & Science Council and the Public Art Commission in partnership with the City of Charlotte commissioned a mural from Ashford to be displayed in the Charlotte Douglas International Airport. Her work, entitled "Honoring All Teachers" is displayed at Concourse A, Gate A6.

Exhibitions of her works have been displayed at the Levine Museum of the New South, the Mint Museum, and Davidson College.

== Awards ==
She is a four-time recipient of the Actors Theatre award and a recipient of the Priscilla Literary Award. In 2007, she was named the Harvey B. Gantt Center's (then known as the Afro-American Cultural Center) artist of the year.
