= The Undercroft, Guildford =

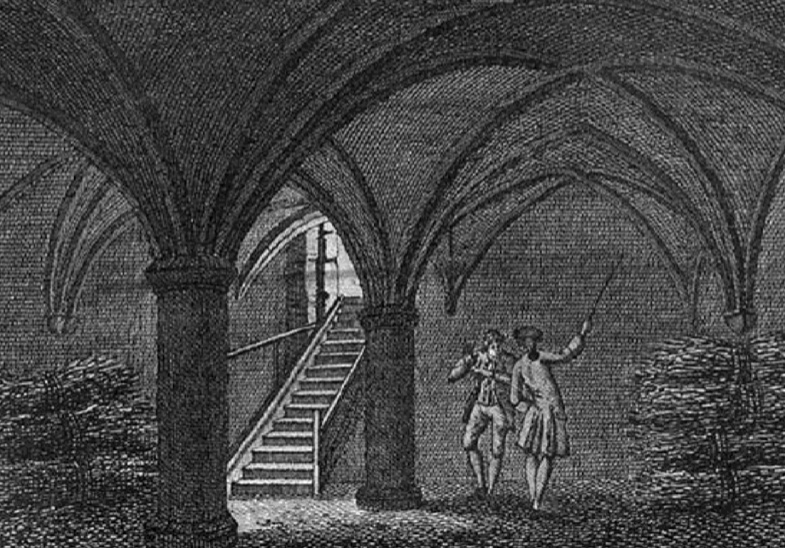
- Print showing the Undercroft as it appeared in the 18th-century

- Location within Surrey
- 51°14′07″N 0°34′25″W
- Type: Undercroft
- Location: 72/74 High Street, Guildford, Surrey
- OS grid reference: SU 99676 49427

History
- Built: 13th century

Scheduled monument
- Official name: Medieval undercroft at 72/74 High Street
- Designated: 27 August 1976
- Reference no.: 1005924

Listed Building – Grade II*
- Official name: 72, 74, 76 and 78, High Street
- Designated: 1 May 1953
- Reference no.: 1180242

The Undercroft at 72/74 High Street in Guildford in Surrey is a medieval undercroft or storage room. It has been described as one of the finest examples of its type in the country. Since 1976 it has been a Grade II* listed building and Scheduled Monument on the List of Historic England.

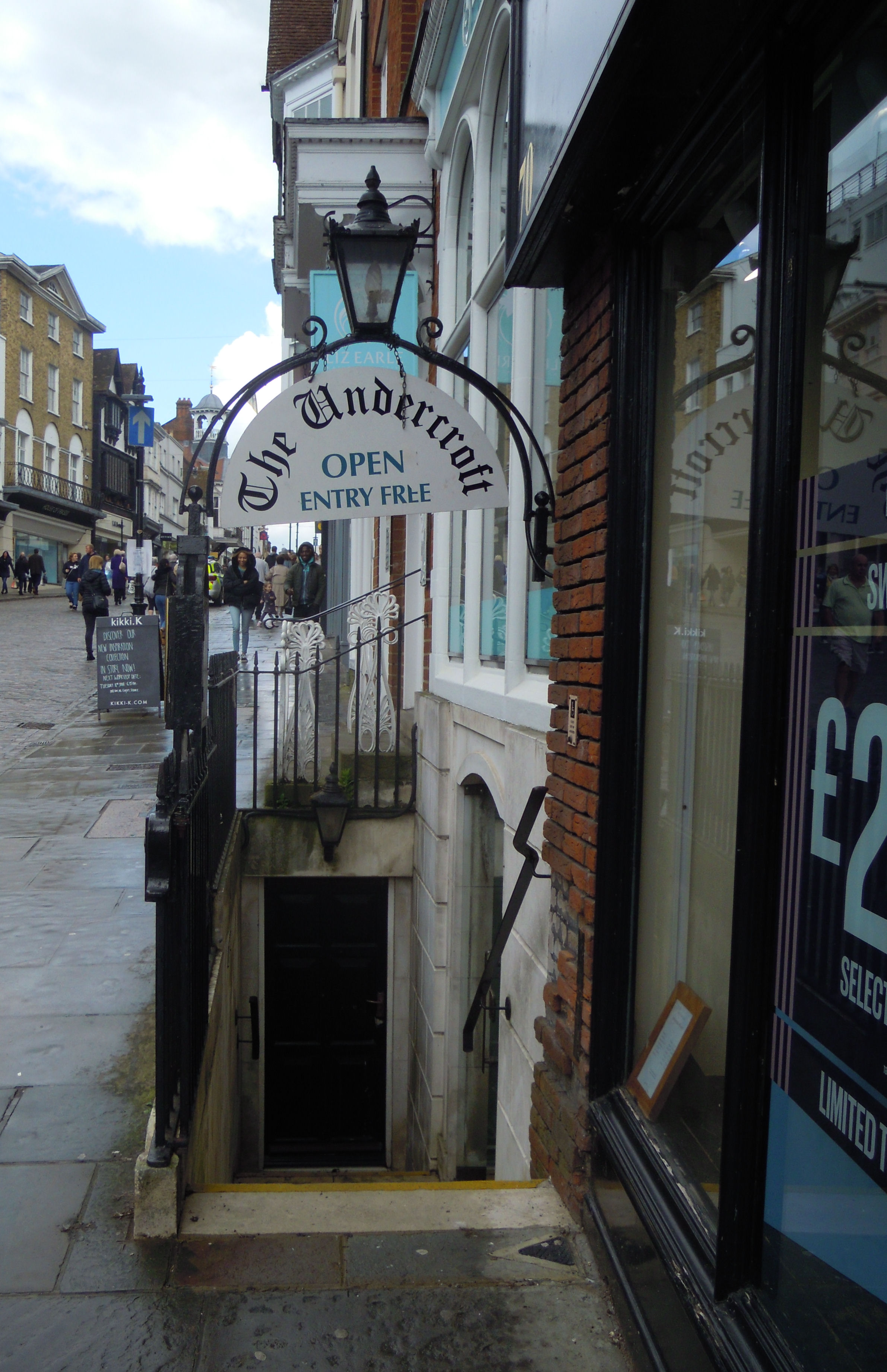
The entrance to the Undercroft on the High Street in Guildford

Generally, a medieval undercroft was built with at least three vaulted bays depending on the wealth or storage needs of the owner. Built of stone and therefore fireproof, an undercroft would have been used for storing foodstuffs or liquids such as barrels of wine or items of value. When built under a house an undercroft and, more importantly its contents, could be watched at all times. While undercrofts are on occasion called 'cellars' they were not exclusively built completely below ground level; the fact of being built into the ground often resulted in their being preserved when the building above was no longer used or when another building was erected in its place. There are the remains of about another half a dozen medieval undercrofts in Guildford. Being constructed of masonry they were costly to build and only could have been afforded by rich merchants which reveals that Guildford was a wealthy town during the Middle Ages.

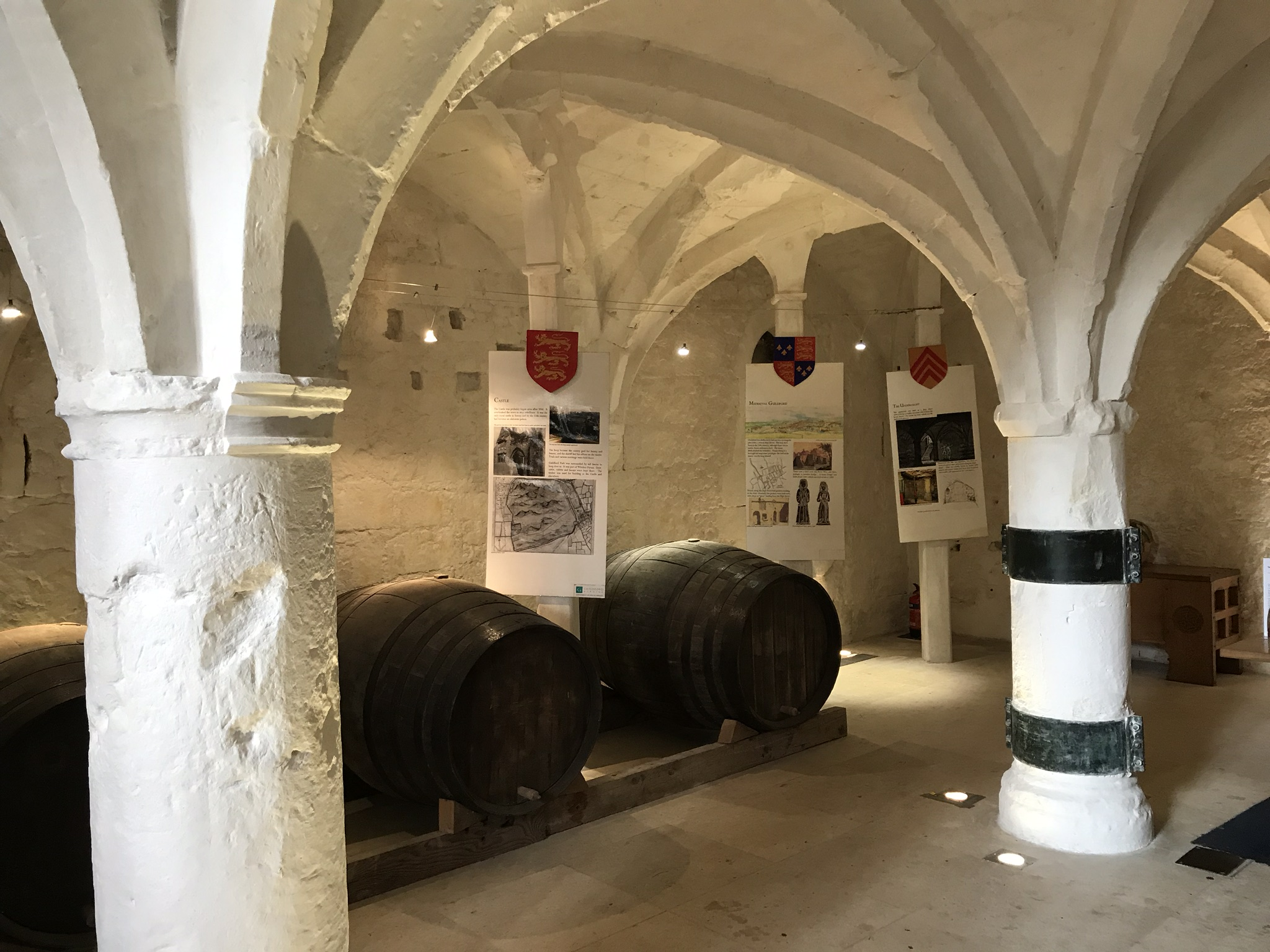
The Undercroft

The Undercroft at Guildford is late 13th-century in date and is believed to have belonged to the house of a merchant above it who dealt in wine or expensive cloths or silk. The Undercroft is three bays in length and measures about 30 feet long by 19 feet wide and 9 feet high (about 10 m by 6 m and 3 m high) and has a rib vaulted ceiling supported by two round central columns or piers. The corbels on the walls are carved with grotesque faces and support the base of the arches. That near the steps shows the head of a woman wearing a wimple which was fashionable women's headwear in the late 13th century. The Undercroft's ceiling is actually above street level which gives ample room for the doorway and the steps leading down from the High Street outside, such access suggesting the Undercroft was originally built as a shop. The doorway being positioned on the downhill side provided maximum headroom while on the room's uphill side a low window was located which provided some daylight. By the far corner in the uphill wall a narrow doorway can be found which led to a spiral staircase to the house above which supports the theory that the Undercroft was originally built as a shop. Of this timber framed structure above nothing now remains. The extant three-storey red brick building above the Undercroft dates to 1803. The Undercroft included a doorway in the south wall which was blocked and replaced sometime in the 19th century.

From the 14th century the Undercroft was largely used for storage, but for much of the 20th century it stood empty until 1989 when the blocked street entrance was reopened and the room renovated for use as an Information Centre for visitors to Guildford. The Information Centre has recently been relocated.

The Undercroft is managed by the nearby Guildford Museum and is open on Wednesdays from May to September – 2 p.m. to 4 p.m. October to April and Saturdays from May to September – 12 p.m. to 4 p.m. Admission is free. There are steps from the street level and there is no disabled access.

== Gallery ==
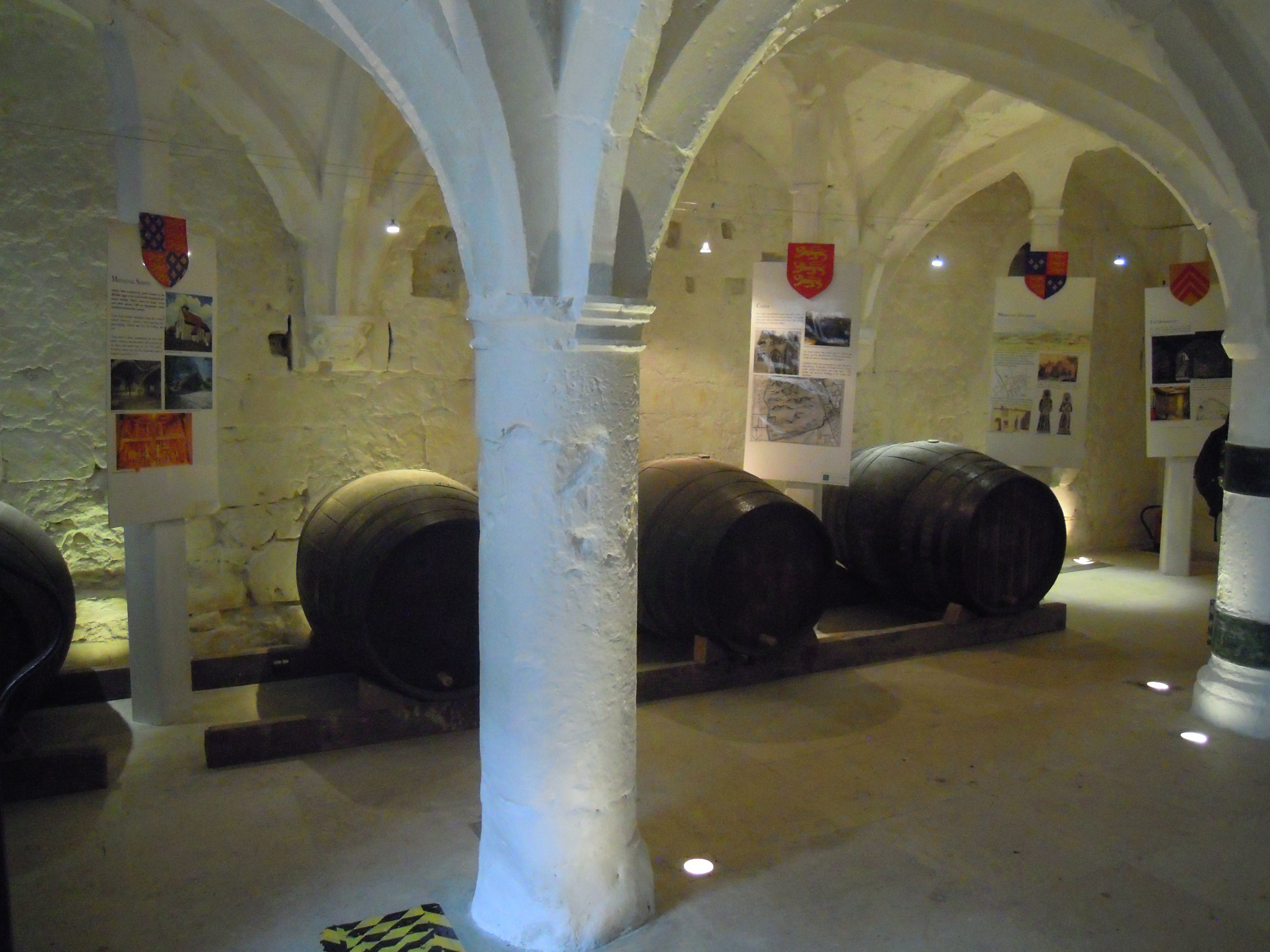
A column supporting the rib vault ceiling

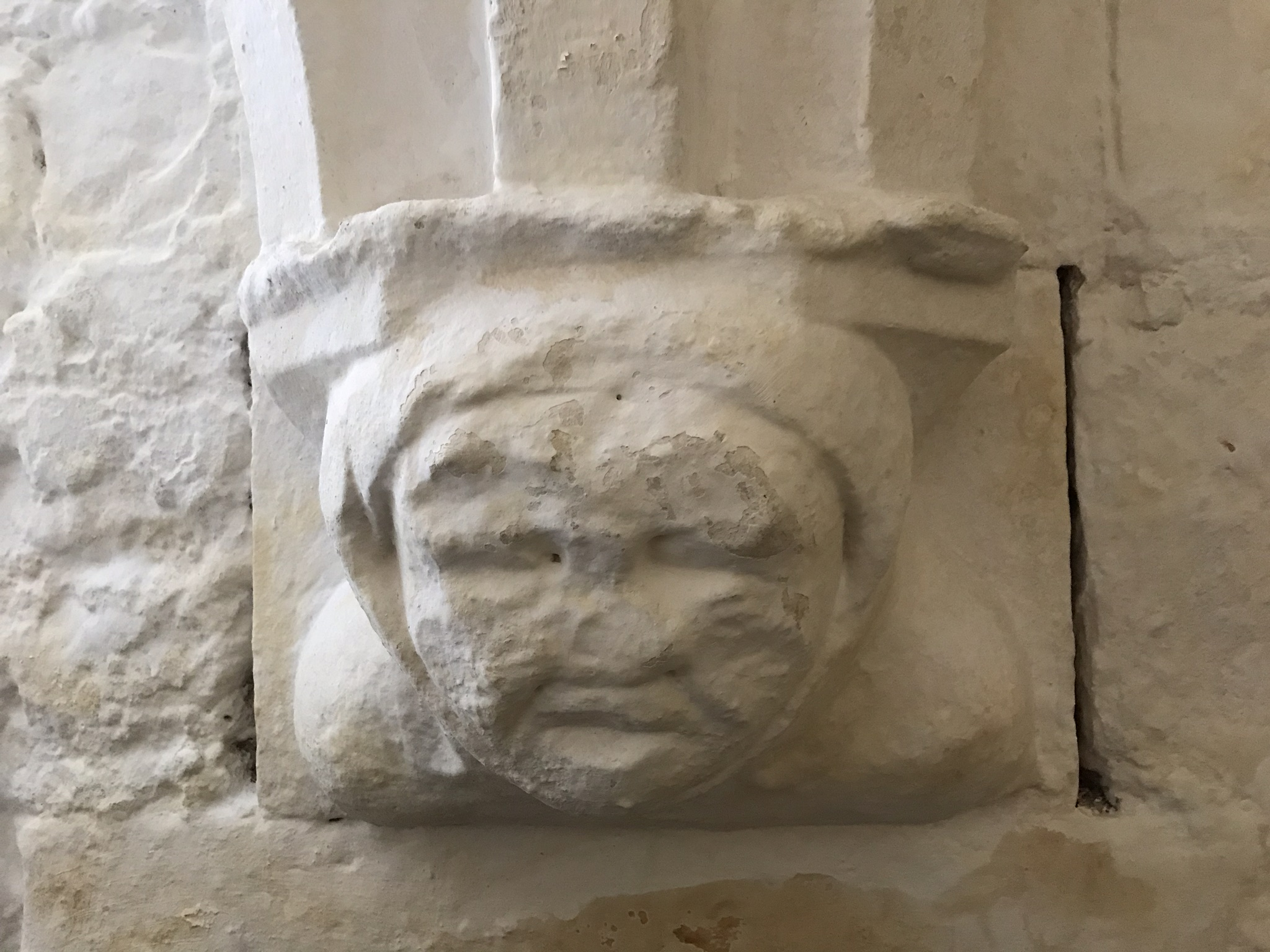
Corbel dating to the late 1200s of a woman wearing a wimple

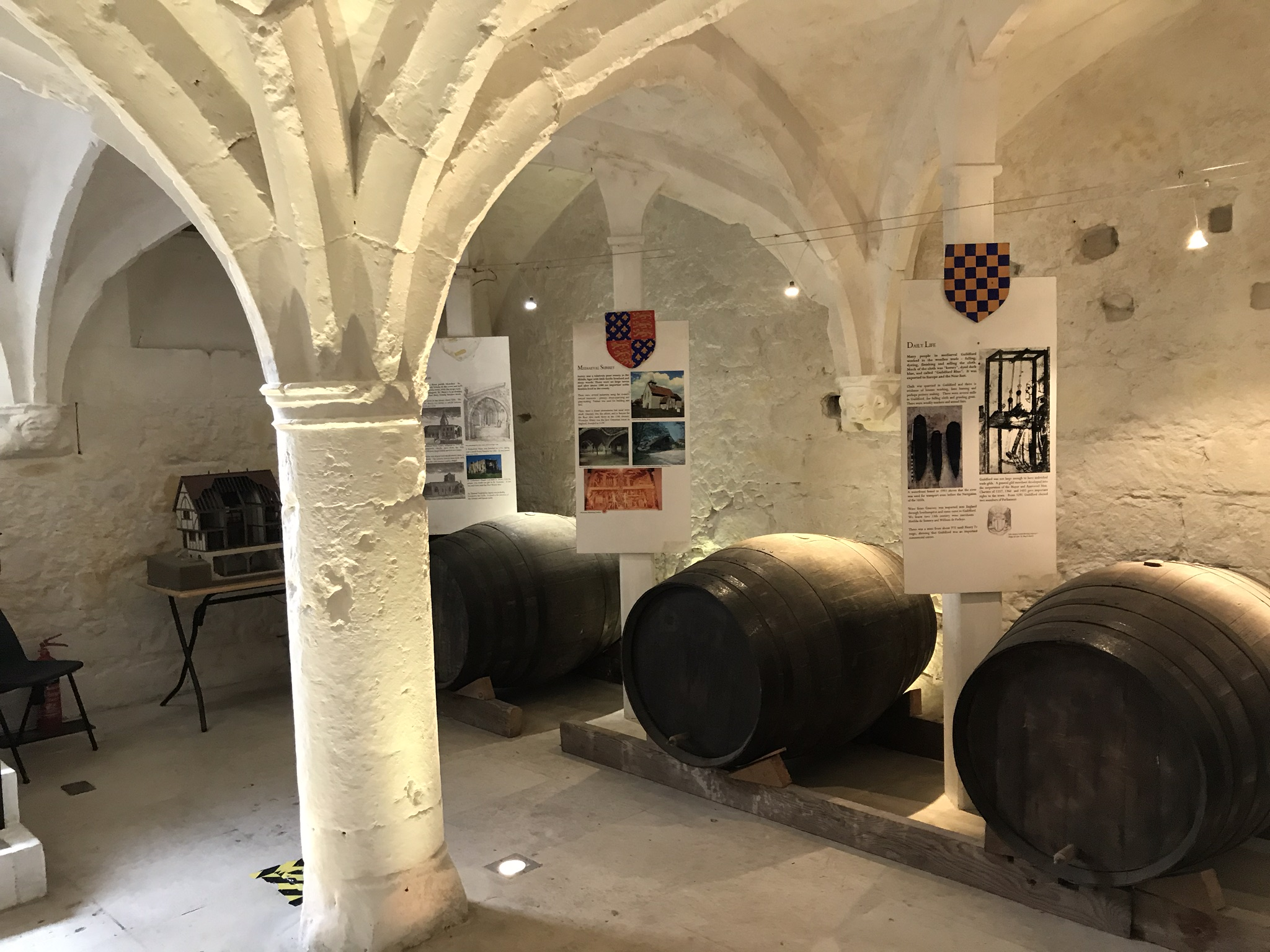
Interior of the Undercroft

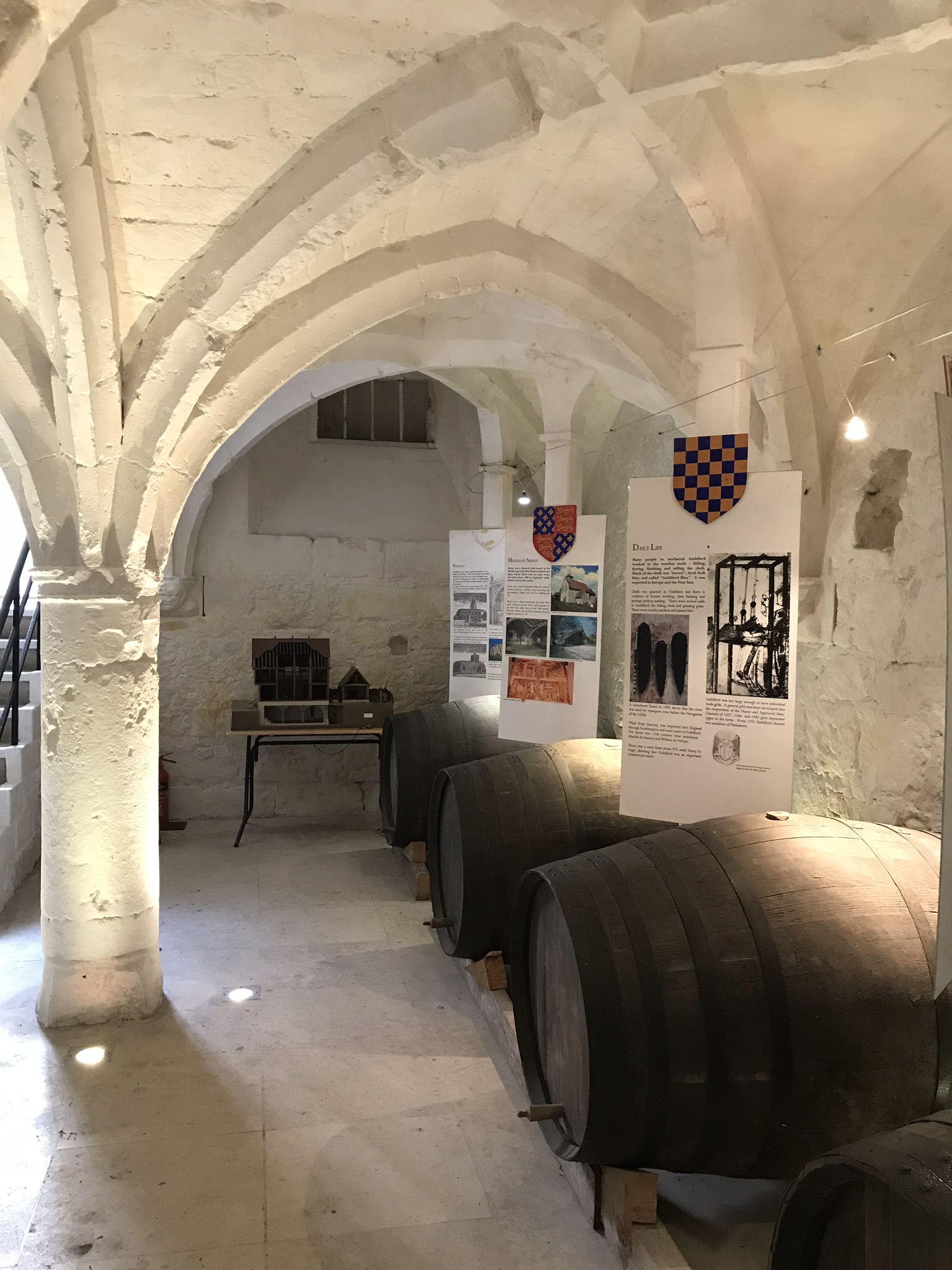
Interior of the Undercroft

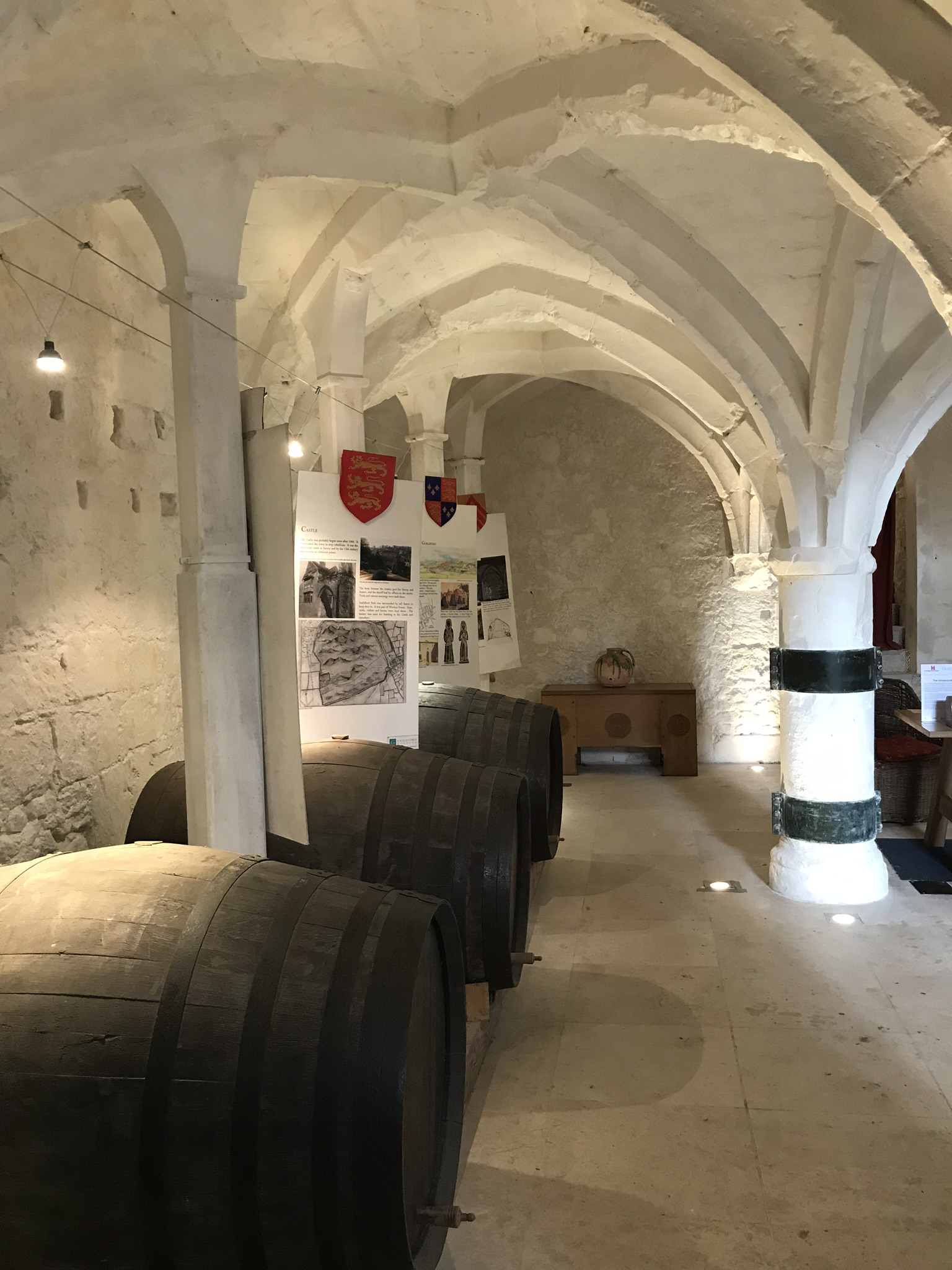
Interior of the Undercroft

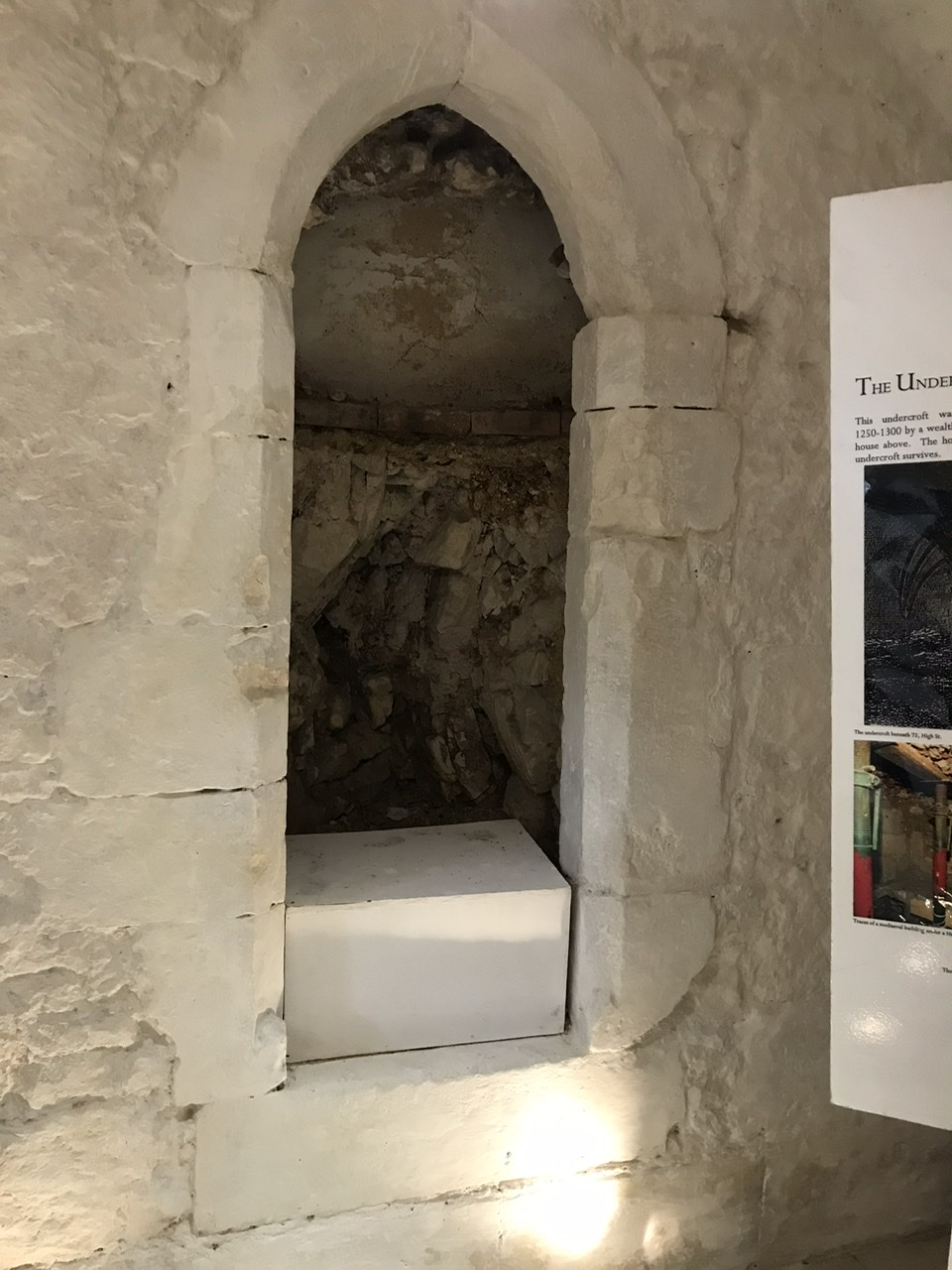
Remains of doorway

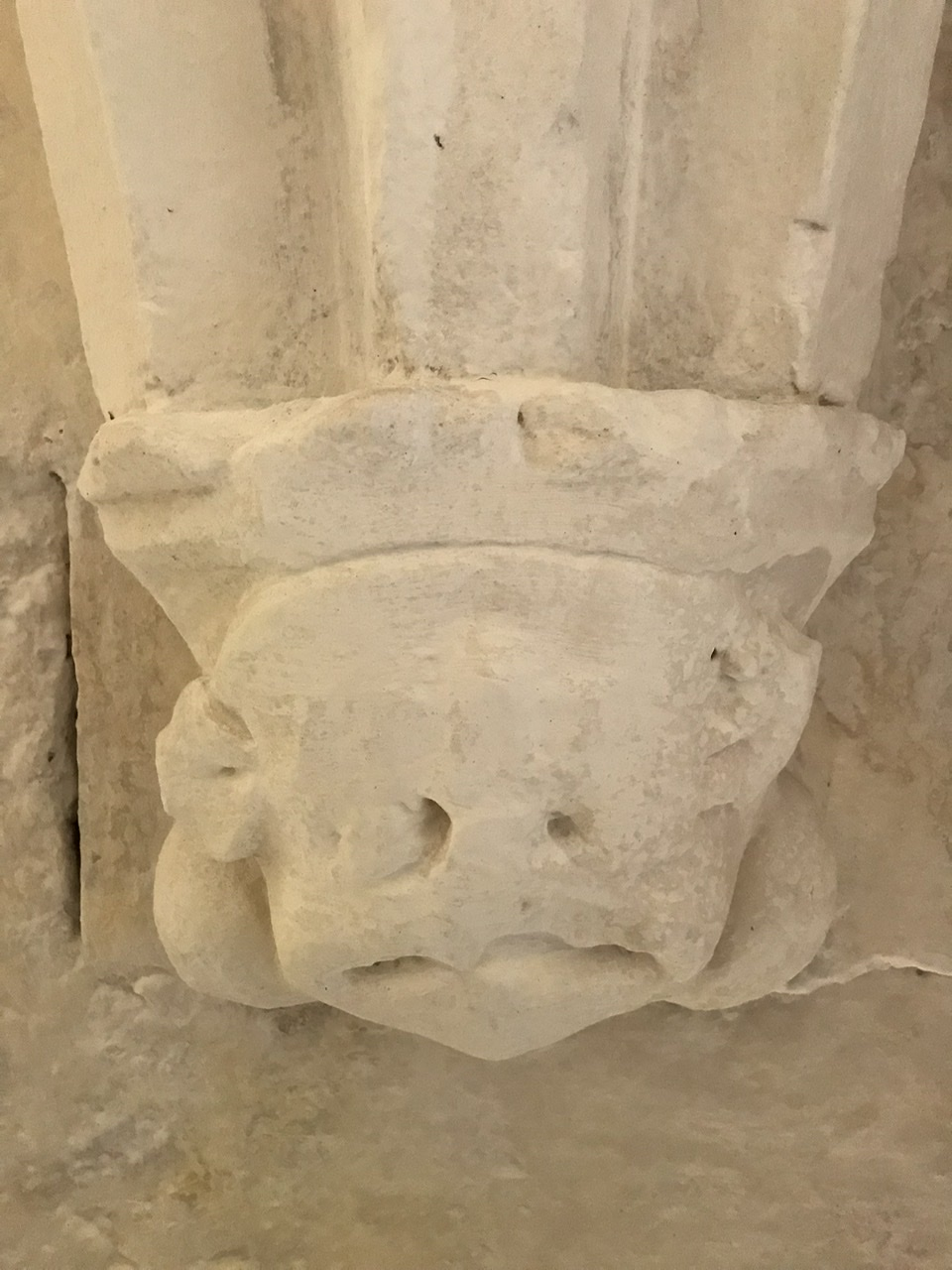
Corbel of a man

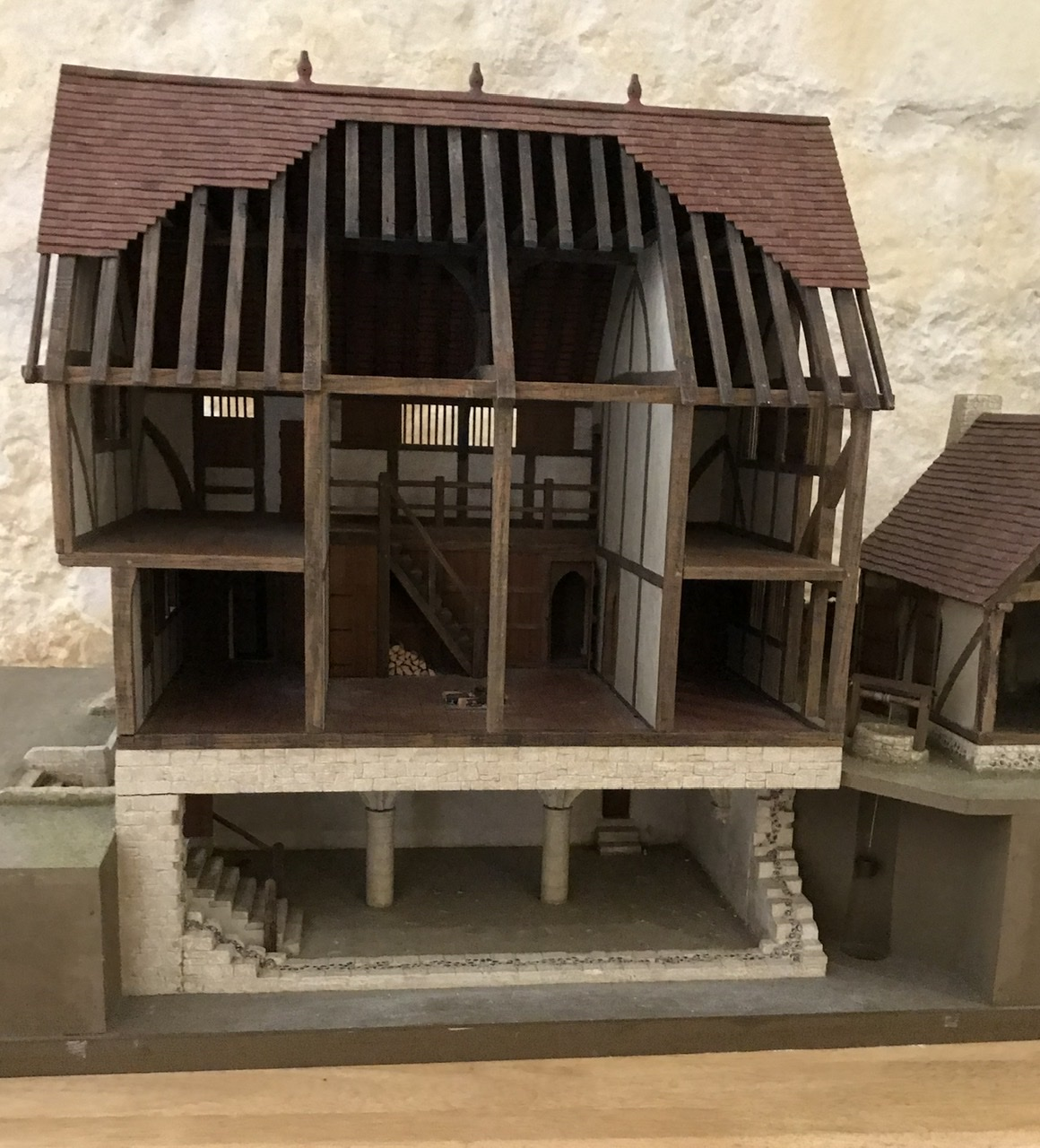
Model showing the Undercroft with the original timber-frame house above
