= Alan Ashford =

English cricketer (born 1944)

Personal information
- Born: 31 December 1944 (age 81); Cheam, England
- Role: Cricketer

Domestic team information
- Years: Team
- 1975–1977: Cornwall

Alan Ashford (born 31 December 1944) was an English cricketer who played for Cornwall. He was born in Cheam.

Ashford made his cricketing debut for Somerset Second XI during the 1975 season.

Ashford's only List A appearance came during the 1977 season, against Lancashire. From the middle order, he scored 5 runs.

Ashford bowled 7 overs in the match, conceding 34 runs.
