= Wanborough Grange =

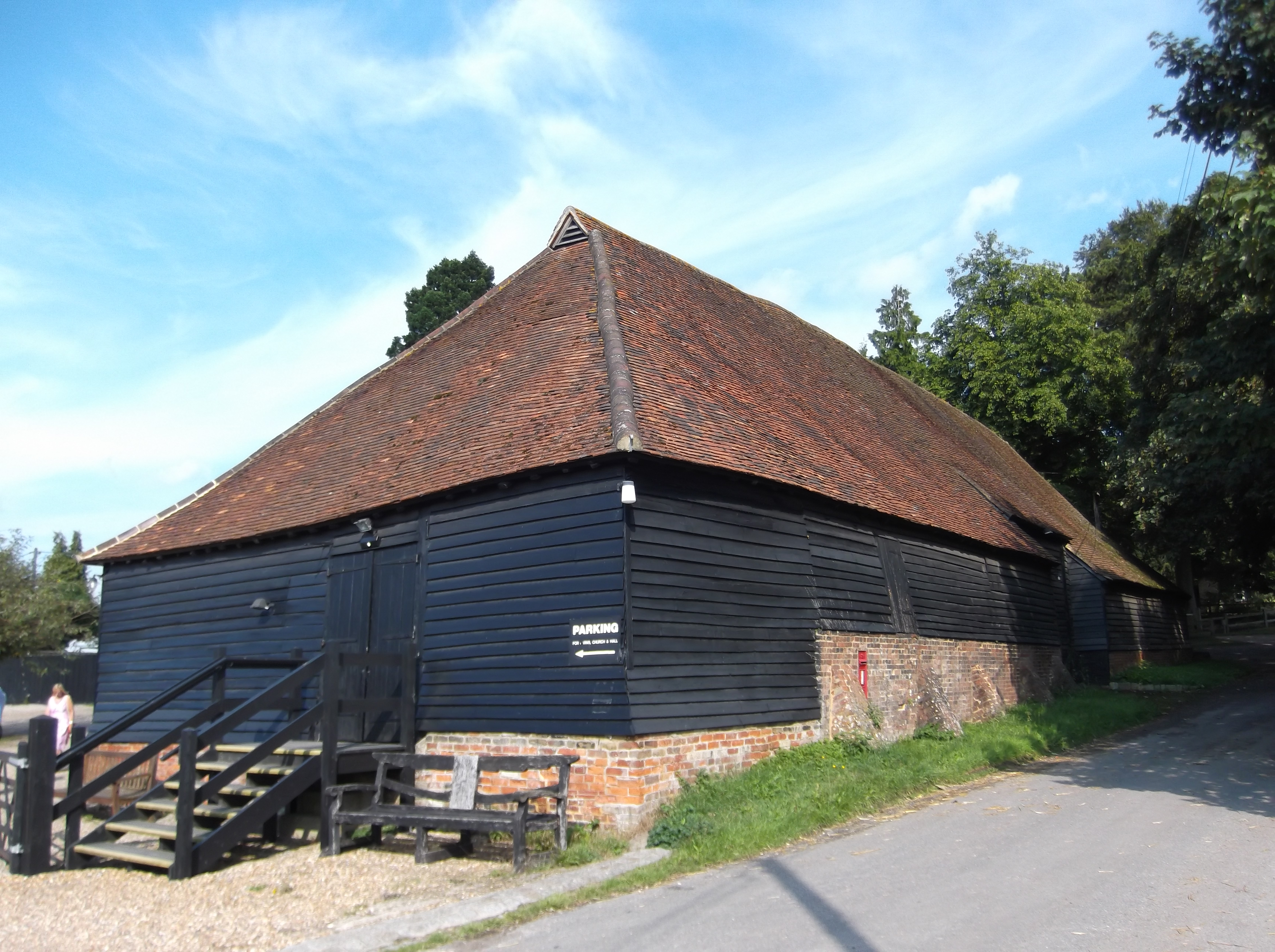
- Restored monastic barn of Wanborough Grange

- Location within Surrey
- 51°13′54″N 0°39′48″W
- Type: Barn
- Location: Wanborough, Surrey

History
- Built: 1388

Site notes
- Governing body: Guildford Museum
- Owner: Guildford Borough Council

Listed Building – Grade II*
- Official name: Barn, 80 yards west of Church of St Bartholomew
- Designated: 14 June 1967
- Reference no.: 1029613

Wanborough Grange refers to an existing late medieval barn and formerly its surrounding monastic grange in Wanborough, Surrey, England.

== History ==
The agricultural estate was owned by Waverley Abbey from 1130 to 1536, the Dissolution of the Monasteries, whereupon (as with most abbey lands) it passed to the Crown. It was added to the manor and wholesale awarded by Henry VIII to a major landowner, William Fitzwilliam, 1st Earl of Southampton, passing on his death to his half brother's family, the Browne baronets. It passed over generations through a succession of inheriting peers: Viscount Montagu, the Earls of Dirletoun and Annandale, the Duke and Duchesses of Hamilton. The latter sold it to the Colwall family who were related by a second marriage to the Onslow family that later became elevated to the title of Earl of Onslow, who was non-resident lord of the manor in 1910. Owing to the economic expansion of the Industrial Revolution and British Empire it became less of a revenue-generating source than previously. The nearby manor house became the grand home of Sir Algernon West in the years around 1910 when the Victoria County History was compiled by H. E. Malden.

== Barn of 1388 ==
The historic barn was built in part in 1388, with a main core from the 15th-century and the roof still later. It is classed within the middle category of listed building, Grade II*. It was restored in 1997, is owned by Guildford Borough Council, and is maintained by the Guildford Museum.
