= Greyfriars, Wanborough =

House in Wanborough, Surrey, England

Greyfriars
- Merleshanger; Wancote
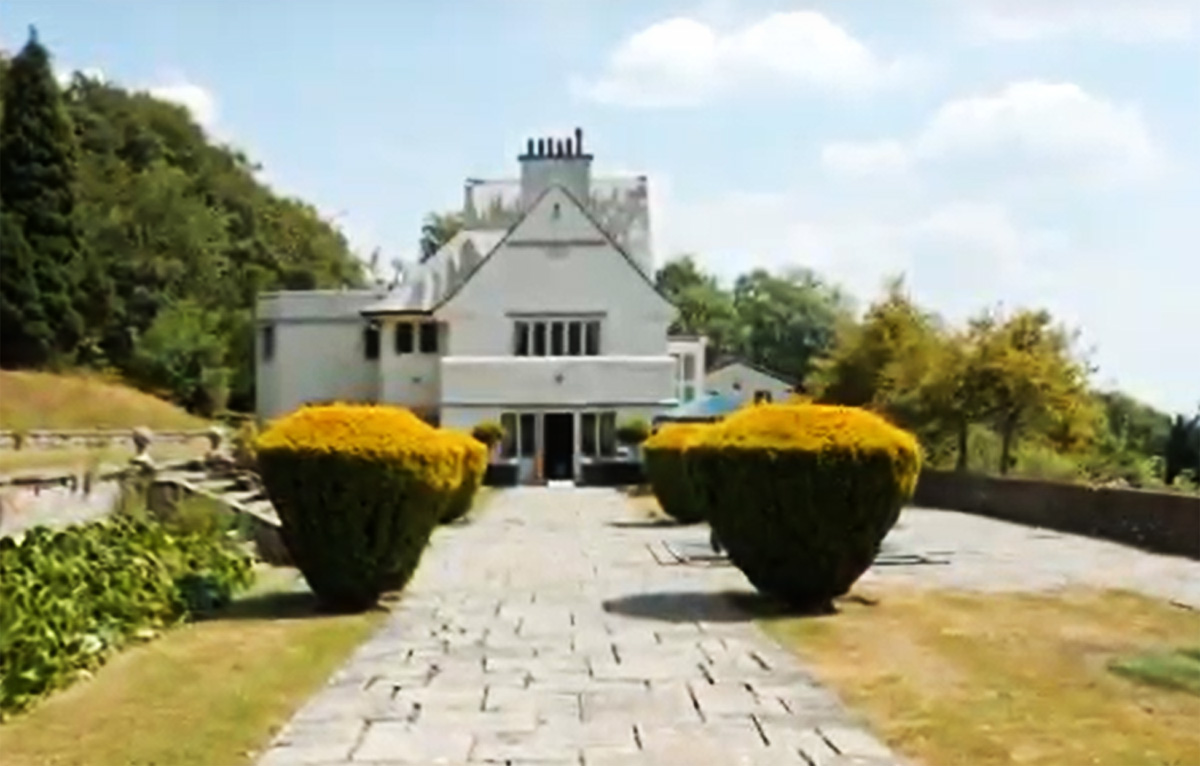
- Greyfriars House

- Location of Greyfriars House in Surrey
- 51°13′34″N 0°38′48″W
- Location: Hog's Back, Surrey

History
- Built: 1896

Site notes
- Architect: C.F.A. Voysey
- Architectural style: Arts and Crafts

Listed Building – Grade II*
- Official name: Greyfriars
- Designated: 13 December 1984
- Reference no.: 1029612

Greyfriars is a Grade II* listed house located on the Hog's Back, in the civil parish of Wanborough, in Surrey, England. It was built in 1896 for the novelist and playwright Julian Sturgis and was designed by the arts and crafts architect C.F.A. Voysey. It has been Grade II* listed on the National Heritage List for England since December 1984. The house was previously known as Wancote, and was initially called Merleshanger.

The house was later extended on its western end by Herbert Baker in 1913–14. 20 drawings of the design and detail of Greyfriars are held in the collection of the Royal Institute of British Architects. Howard Gaye's watercolour of Greyfriars was exhibited at the Royal Academy in 1897. Voysey's distinctive heart shaped motif is on Greyfriar's letter box, hinges and door handles.

The house was put up for sale with its staff cottages in 2003 for £3 million.

== The Sturgis family ==
Julian Russell Sturgis (1848-1904) who built Greyfriars House was a notable Victorian novelist, poet and musical composer. He was born in Boston, USA in 1848. His father was Russell Sturgis the famous merchant and later head of Baring Bank. He came to England at an early age. He went to Eton and later obtained his degree at the University of Oxford where he excelled in football and rowing. He later became a barrister. However his real love was writing and in 1878 he embarked on a career as a novelist. In 1883 his father died and left him a considerable fortune. He had a London residence in Knightsbridge as well as a country house.

In 1883 he married Mary Maud, daughter of Colonel Marcus de la Poer Beresford and the couple had three sons. In 1896 he commissioned the famous architect Charles Voysey to build Greyfriars House. It is still considered to be one of Voysey's best designs. The famous architectural expert Nikolaus Pevsner made the following comment.

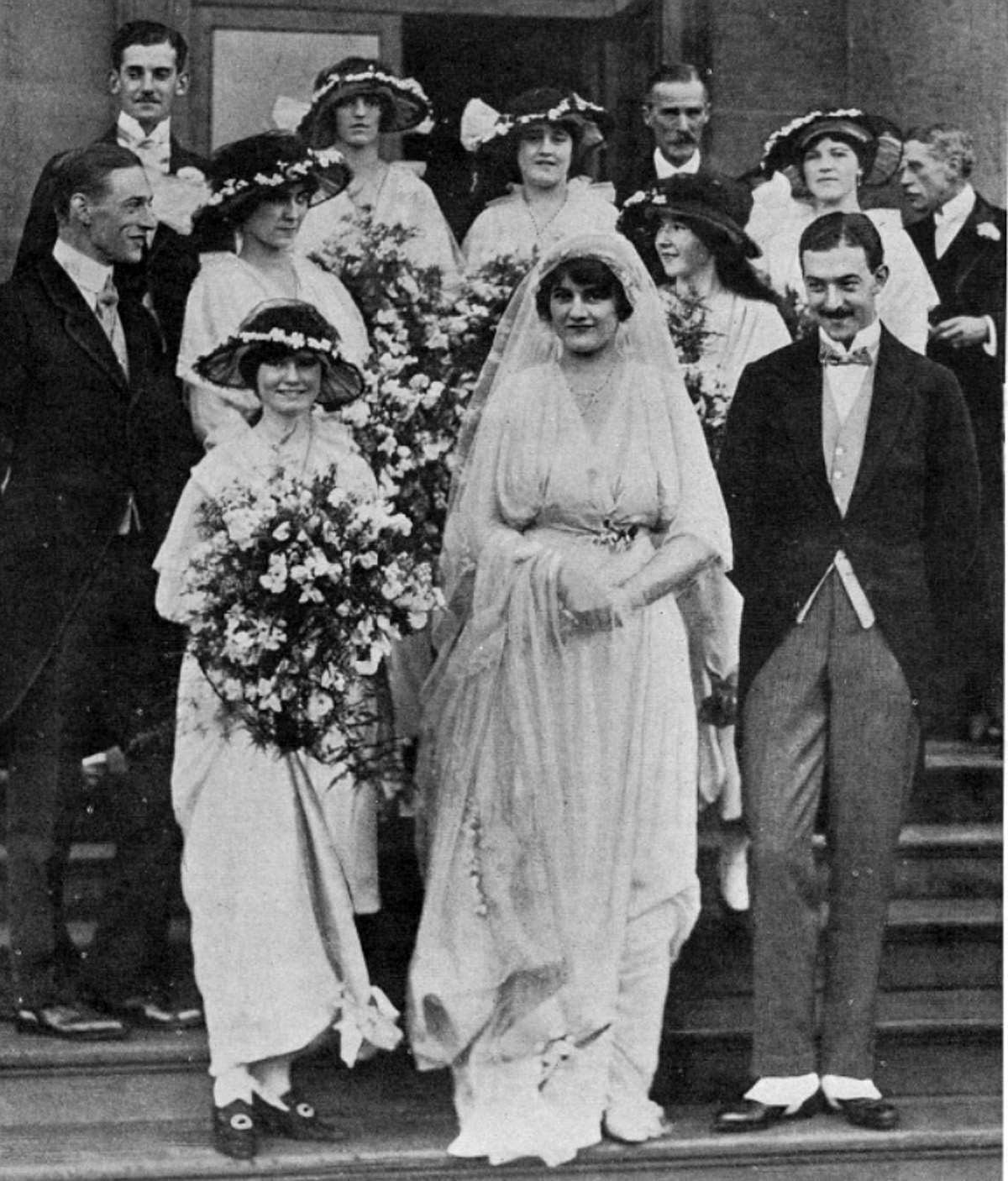
Wedding of Sir Mark Beresford Russell Grant-Sturgis in 1914

"Greyfriars is one of Voysey’s best houses built in 1896 for Julian Sturgis. Superb position facing just under the brow of Hog’s Back. The long, low roughcast house ties itself self-effacingly into the landscape and the pleasure to be got from walking around it is that of a continuous interchange between building and landscape without any single view that can be analysed in detail."

Being a writer Julian had several famous friends who visited him at Greyfriars House (then called Wancote). Henry James in 1904 sent a letter to Julian's recently widowed wife mentioning his long friendship with her husband. He continued to occasionally visit her at the house after Julian's death He noted in one of his letters of 1912 to a friend that he recently went there for a weekend. Julian was also a friend of Arthur Christopher Benson whom he sometimes visited and who returned his visits by coming to Greyfriars.

When Julian died in 1904 his wife Mary and his son Sir Mark Beresford Russell Grant-Sturgis (1884-1949) continued to live at the house. In 1914 Mark married Rachel Montagu-Stuart-Wortley-Mackenzie, daughter of the 2nd Earl of Wharncliff. The wedding was widely reported in the newspapers and a photo is shown. The couple had two sons.

He was assistant private secretary to H. H. Asquith when chancellor of the exchequer (1906–8), and private secretary to him as prime minister (1908–10). He later became Assistant Under Secretary for Ireland between 1920 and 1922. During this time he wrote five volumes of diaries on the Irish uprising.

In 1920 the Sturgis family put Greyfriars House on the market and it was sold to Philip Lyle

== Other residents ==
Philip Lyle who bought the house in the 1920s lived there for the next 15 years. He was a Director in the Tate & Lyle sugar refining company. In 1926 he invited the magazine “Garden Life” to the house and they wrote an article describing the property at this time. He sold the house in 1936 and it was bought by Robert Heap Turner (1900-1986), the wealthy industrialist. He lived there for the next 50 years and after his death in 1986 the house was sold.
