= Ashford Bowdler =

Village in Shropshire, England

Coordinates: 52.3315°N 2.7110°W

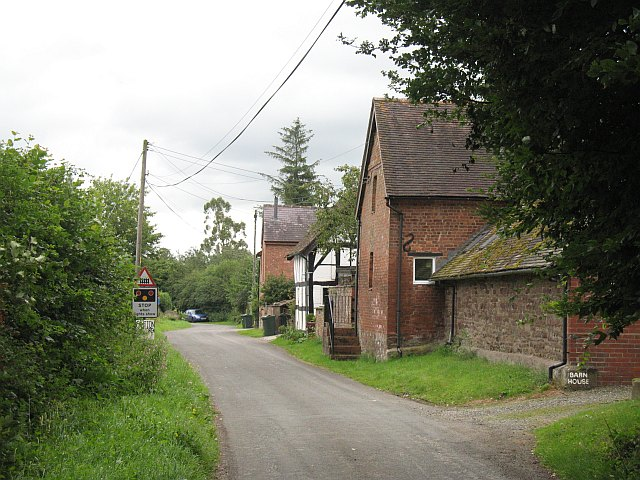

- Location within Shropshire
- Population: 64
- OS grid reference: SO516706
- Civil parish: Ashford Bowdler
- Unitary authority: Shropshire
- Ceremonial county: Shropshire
- Region: West Midlands
- Country: England
- Sovereign state: United Kingdom
- Post town: Ludlow
- Postcode district: SY8
- Dialling code: 01584
- Police: West Mercia
- Fire: Shropshire
- Ambulance: West Midlands
- UK Parliament: Ludlow

Ashford Bowdler is a small village and civil parish in south Shropshire, England, near the county border with Herefordshire.

== Geography ==
The parish lies 1.96 miles (3.15 km) south of the market town of Ludlow. The Parish is bisected West to East by the A49. The village of Ashford Bowdler lies 2.5 miles (4.0 km) South of Ludlow on the western side of the River Teme, facing the larger Ashford Carbonell, at an elevation of between 70 metres (230 ft) and 75 metres (246 ft) above sea level. The A49 road passes just to the west of the village. The River Teme acts as the boundary between the parishes of Ashford Bowdler and Ashford Carbonel. The river is crossed locally by Ashford Bridge, which takes the Caynham Road East from the A49 towards Caynham. The northern parish boundary is at Ashford Hall lying to the West of the A49 at the junction with the Overton Road (the old A49), The west parish boundary commences at the Oakery, Wheatcommon Lane and heads South towards Featherknowle. It borders Richard's Castle Parish boundary along the western edge.

== Parish ==
The civil parish had an estimated population of 64 in 2010; the parish includes the farm and cottage at Feather Knowle and the country house, Ashford Hall Grade II*. Further Grade II Listed Buildings can be found within this settlement on Wheatcommon Lane. The Rhyse, a former stableblock to Ashford Hall and The Rhyse Farm. To the West of Ashford Hall lying on the parish boundary with Richard's Castle, there is a small 10 pitch gypsy and travellers site dating back to 2008. Instead of a parish council, there is a parish meeting.

== Level crossing ==
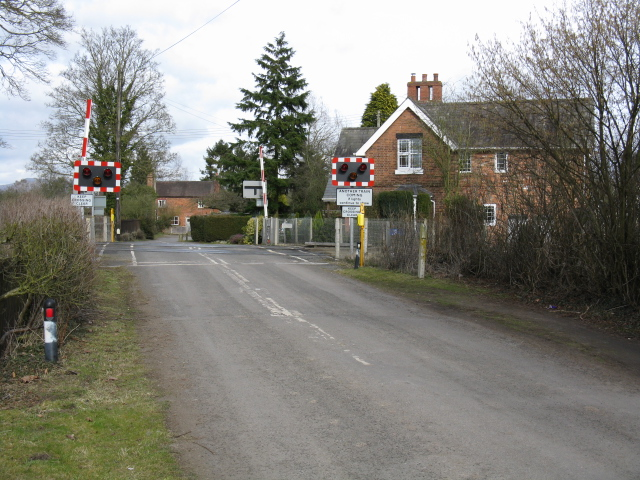
The level crossing, seen in 2010 (before the proposed upgrading)

The Shrewsbury to Newport railway line passes through the village and there is a level crossing for vehicles and pedestrians. In 2014 Network Rail proposed closing this crossing, as part of improvements to signalling and safety on the line, but potentially effectively dividing the village community. In 2015 it was however announced that, following a public consultation, the level crossing would be upgraded (with full barriers replacing the existing "half" barriers) instead of being closed.

== History ==
Ashford Bowdler was historically connected with Bromfield Priory. It formed part of the hundred of Culvestan, which in the 12th century became Munslow.

A short-lived railway station was located on the Shrewsbury to Hereford line to the north of the village, on the Caynham Road, near Ashford Bridge. It opened to passengers in 1854 then closed in 1855.

== Church ==
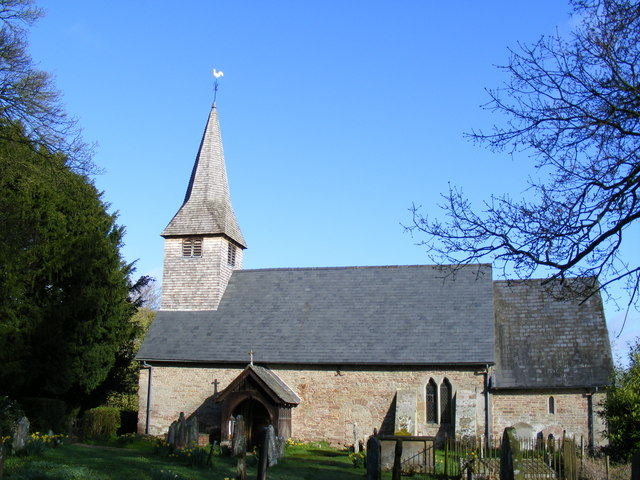
St Andrew's church

The parish church, in the Diocese of Hereford, is situated by the River Teme and was constructed about 1211; it is dedicated to Saint Andrew.

The river has gradually eroded towards the church. In 1906, whilst undergoing repairs, the chancel collapsed into the river and had to be replaced by a smaller construction. At the beginning of the 21st century major engineering works had to be undertaken to defend the church from the river, which now flows right alongside part of the building's foundations.

The church contains a brass plaque as war memorial to parishioners who died serving in World War I as well as a Roll of Honour of all who served. The churchyard contains a Commonwealth war grave of a World War I Royal Naval Reserve officer.

== See also ==
- Listed buildings in Ashford Bowdler
