= Ashford, South Hams =

Hamlet in Devon, England

Coordinates: 50.3228°N 3.8448°W

Ashford
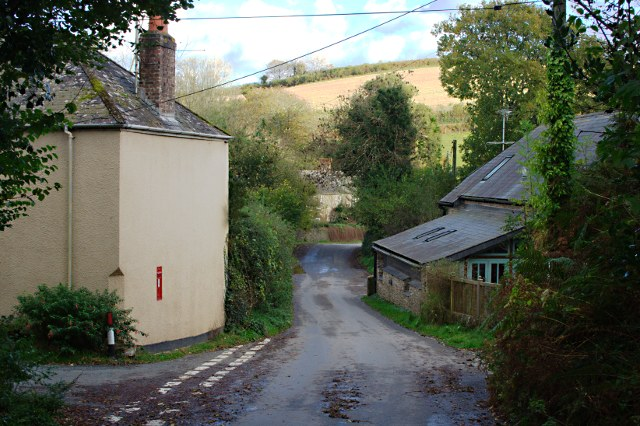
- The road through Ashford

- Location within Devon
- OS grid reference: SX6848
- District: South Hams
- Shire county: Devon
- Region: South West
- Country: England
- Sovereign state: United Kingdom
- Police: Devon and Cornwall
- Fire: Devon and Somerset
- Ambulance: South Western

Ashford is a hamlet in the South Hams district, in the county of Devon, England.
