= Undercroft =

Cellar or storage room

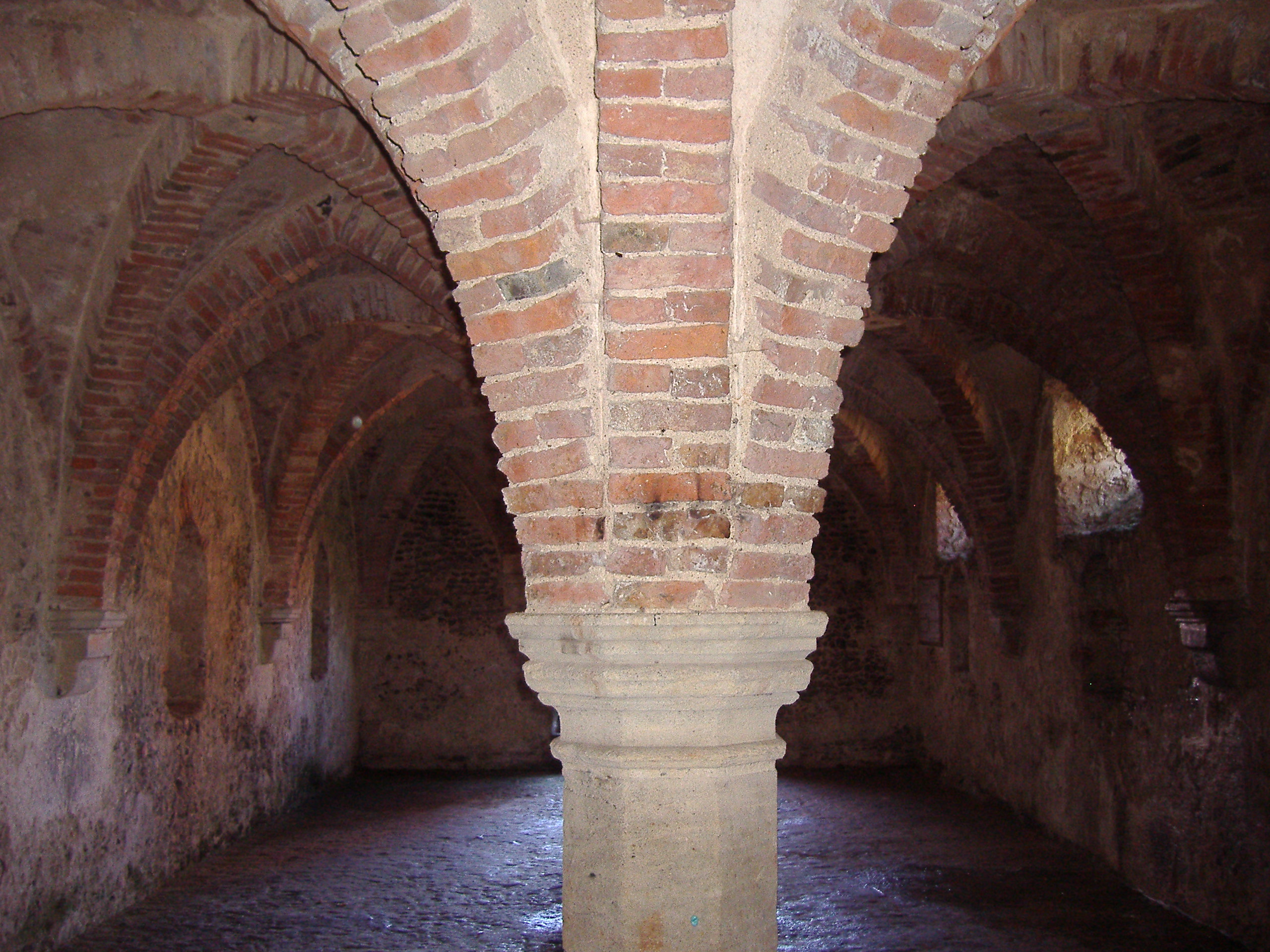
The Undercroft at Blakeney Guildhall in Norfolk

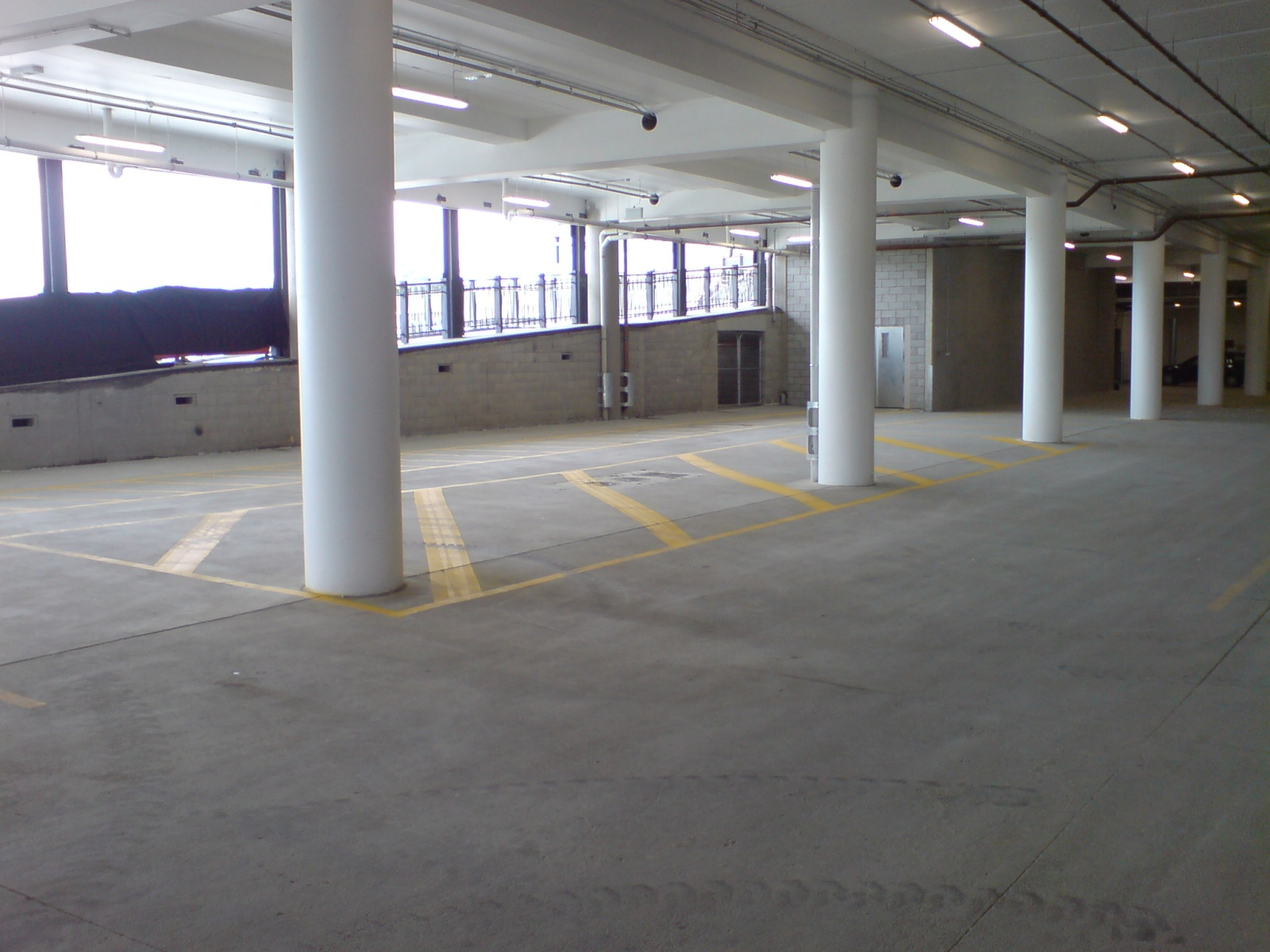
A modern parking undercroft beneath a cinema

An undercroft is traditionally a cellar or storage room, often brick-lined and vaulted, and used for storage in buildings since medieval times. In modern usage, an undercroft is generally a ground (street-level) area which is relatively open to the sides, but covered by the building above.

== History ==
While some were used as simple storerooms, others were rented out as shops. For example, the undercroft rooms at Myres Castle in Fife, Scotland, of c. 1300 were used as the medieval kitchen and a range of stores. Many of these early medieval undercrofts were vaulted or groined, such as the vaulted chamber at Beverston Castle in Gloucestershire or the groined stores at Myres Castle. The term is sometimes used to describe a crypt beneath a church, used for burial purposes. For example, there is a 14th-century undercroft or crypt extant at Muchalls Castle in Aberdeenshire in Scotland, even though the original chapel above it was destroyed in an act of war in 1746.

Undercrofts were commonly built in England and Scotland throughout the thirteenth and early fourteenth centuries. They occur in cities such as London, Chester, Coventry and Southampton. The undercroft beneath the Houses of Parliament in London was rented to the conspirators behind the Gunpowder Plot.

Many cathedrals have an undercroft.

== Modern usage ==
In modern buildings, the term undercroft is often used to describe a ground-level parking area that occupies the footprint of the building (and sometimes extends to other service or garden areas around the structure). This type of parking is, however, discouraged by some urban design guidelines, as it prevents the ground floor from having activities (shops, restaurants or similar) that provide for a lively streetscape.

== See also ==
- The Undercroft, Guildford
- The Undercroft, Southbank Centre – skateboarding and graffiti centre in London
- Lincoln Memorial Undercroft
- Void deck
