= Friday Street =

Hamlet in Surrey, England

Coordinates: 51°11′51″N 0°23′08″W

- Hamlet
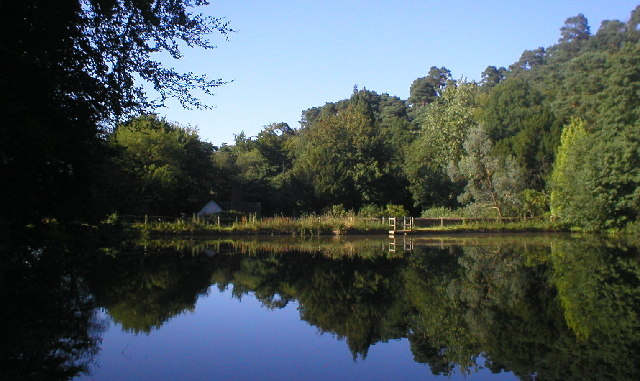
- Hammer Pond at Friday Street

- Location within Surrey
- OS grid reference: TQ129455
- District: Mole Valley
- Shire county: Surrey
- Region: South East
- Country: England
- Sovereign state: United Kingdom
- Post town: Dorking
- Postcode district: RH5
- Dialling code: 01306
- Police: Surrey
- Fire: Surrey
- Ambulance: South East Coast
- UK Parliament: Dorking and Horley

Friday Street is a hamlet on the gentle lower north slope of Leith Hill in Surrey, England. It is in a wooded headwater ravine, just to the south of Wotton and the A25, a single rather than dual carriageway road, running between Guildford to the west and Dorking to the east. It is part of the Surrey Hills AONB.

== History and geography ==
Friday Street is part of the relatively sparsely populated civil parish of Wotton. Central to Friday Street on most maps is its hammer pond, fed by the Friday Street stream, a tributary of the River Tillingbourne. It is one of three in the Vale of Holmesdale in Surrey, being in a narrow band of ironstone-rich hills, the Greensand Ridge. These were in use from the medieval age until the early 19th century when wholly surpassed by metalwork production specialist centres, principally Sheffield and the West Midlands, assisted by cheap inter-regional transport, coal replacing charcoal as a fuel and by technological advances.

Fewer than 20 houses have been built and the area is surrounded by the second largest wooded common in Surrey, Wotton Common also known as Leith Hill Common, preceded by the Hurtmoor in the same range of hills.

In censuses conducted by the Office for National Statistics, Friday Street is too small to make up a census unit centred on it, without including other land, and has varied map definitions.

== Landmarks ==
Wotton House, the largest house, is on the northern borders of the hamlet. The next largest, the Grade II listed Pond Cottage, was built, according to Historic England, "possibly for an iron master". It is a timber framed 17th century house, clad in galleted Bargate rubble to the lower storey with bricks above and its wall plate exposed under a tiled roof.

A former inn on the edge of the hamlet bore the name of Stephan Langton, Archbishop of Canterbury during the reign of King John and signatory of Magna Carta. The current building replaces an earlier building that burnt down in the 1930s. It won Surrey Life’s Food and Drink Awards and Pub of the Year in 2016 but closed in 2020, was sold and converted into a house. Martin Tupper, poet and antiquarian, wrote a biography of Stephan Langton in 1858 depicting his time in this area.

=== Tillingbourne Waterfall ===
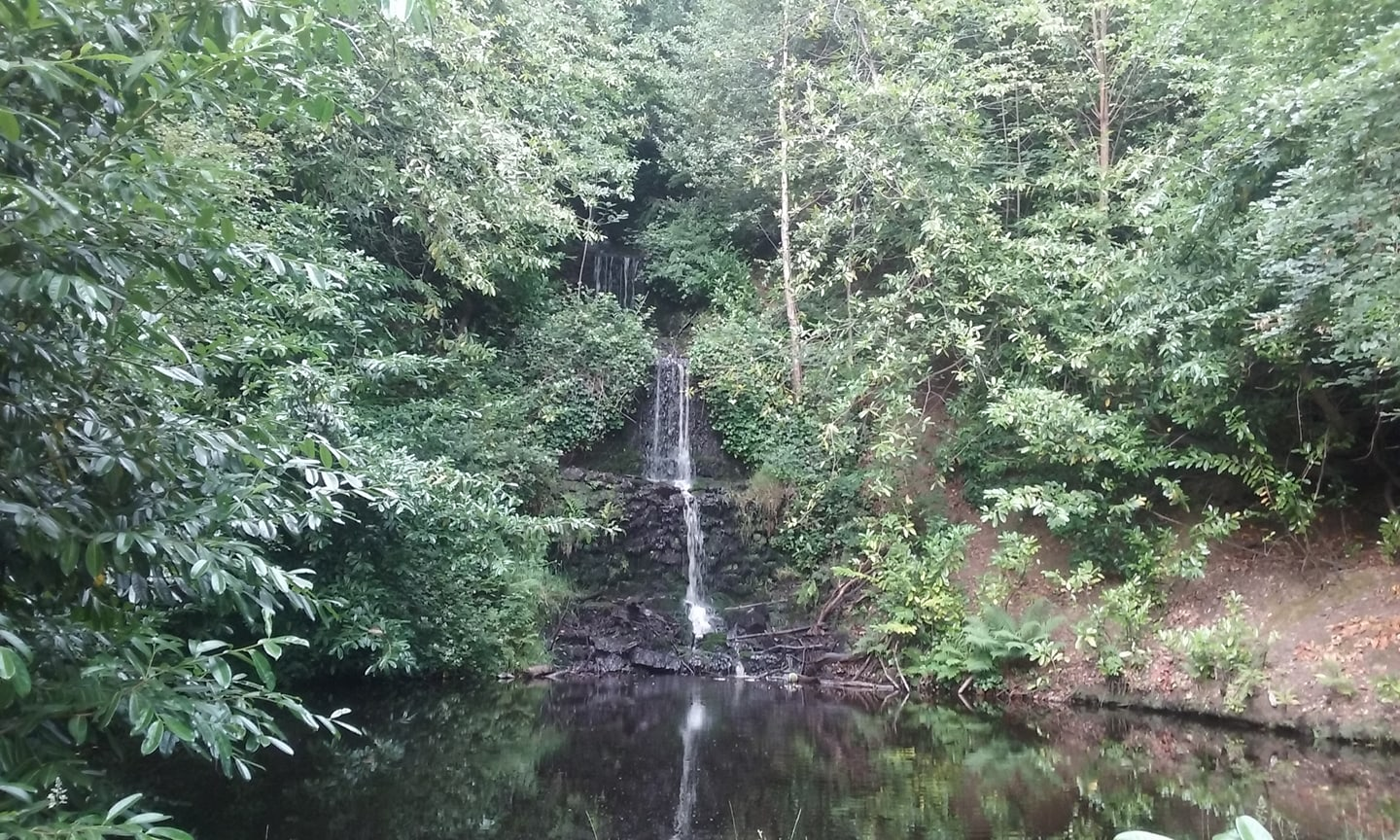
The Tillingbourne Waterfall near Friday Street

Not far from the source of the River Tillingbourne at Tilling Springs is Surrey's tallest waterfall, situated to the east of a public footpath heading north towards Wotton between the hamlets of Friday Street and Broadmoor.

== In film, fiction and the media ==
Friday Street also features as the title of a song on the album Heavy Soul by Surrey native Paul Weller.

In 1984 Friday Street was used as a location for the BBC Television series The Tripods based on the books by John Christopher, where, for the sake of the story it became the fictional future village of "Wherton."
