= Italian garden =

Style of garden based on symmetry and ample water features

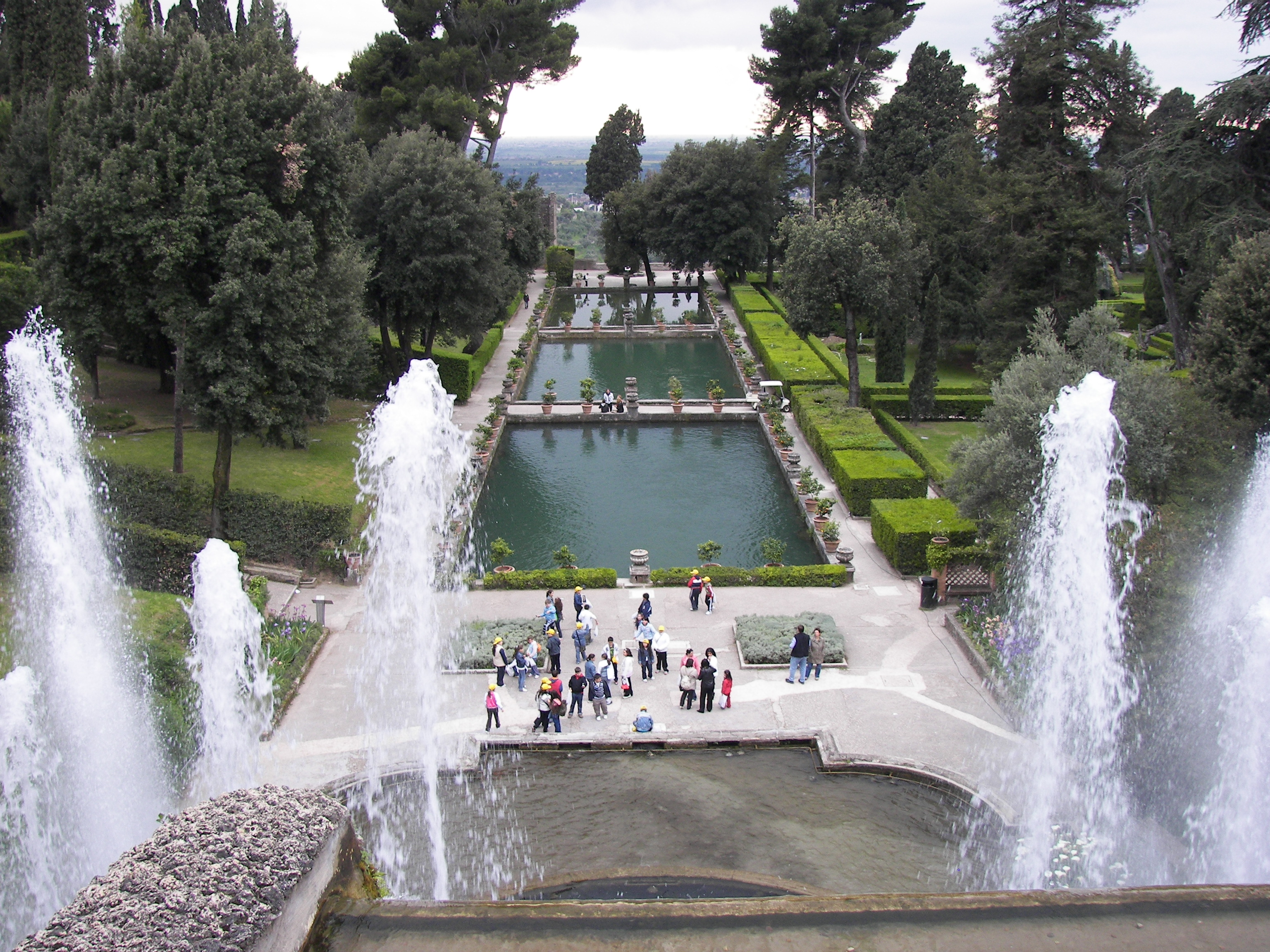
Garden of Villa d'Este

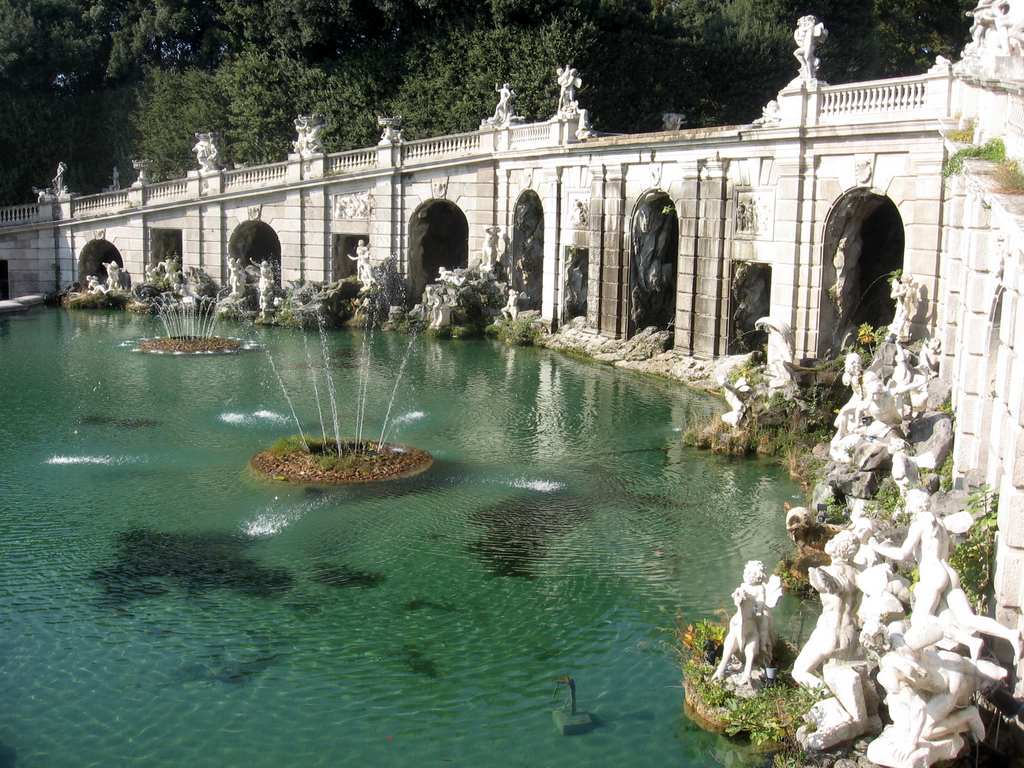
Statues in the gardens of the Palace of Caserta

Italian garden (Italian: giardino all'italiana, [dʒarˈdiːno allitaˈljaːna]) typically refers to a style of gardens, wherever located, reflecting a number of large Italian Renaissance gardens which have survived in something like their original form. In the history of gardening, during the Renaissance, Italy had the most advanced and admired gardens in Europe, which greatly influenced other countries, especially the French formal garden and Dutch gardens and, mostly through these, gardens in Britain.

The gardens were formally laid out, but probably in a somewhat more relaxed fashion than the later French style, aiming to extend or project the regularity of the architecture of the house into nature. A garden in something of the same style, and using many Mediterranean plants, is often called an "Italian garden" anywhere in the world.

From the late 18th century many grand Italian gardens were remade in a version of the English landscape garden style, and the range of garden types actually found in Italy is considerable, partly depending on different climatic conditions.

== History and influence ==
The Italian garden was influenced by Roman gardens and Italian Renaissance gardens. The principles of the French garden are based on those of the Italian garden, but André le Nôtre ultimately eclipsed it in scale and concept at the gardens of Vaux-le-Vicomte and Versailles during the 17th Century. The formal early English garden was influenced by the fountains and cascades that were elements of the Italian Renaissance garden, and though there are later water features – for example, the 300-year-old cascade at Chatsworth House – Italian influence was superseded in England by seventeenth-century formal Franco-Dutch parterres and avenues. From the early eighteenth century onward, thanks to gardeners like Charles Bridgeman, William Kent, Capability Brown, and Humphry Repton garden design in England took a completely different, romantic and informal turn.

=== Roman influence ===
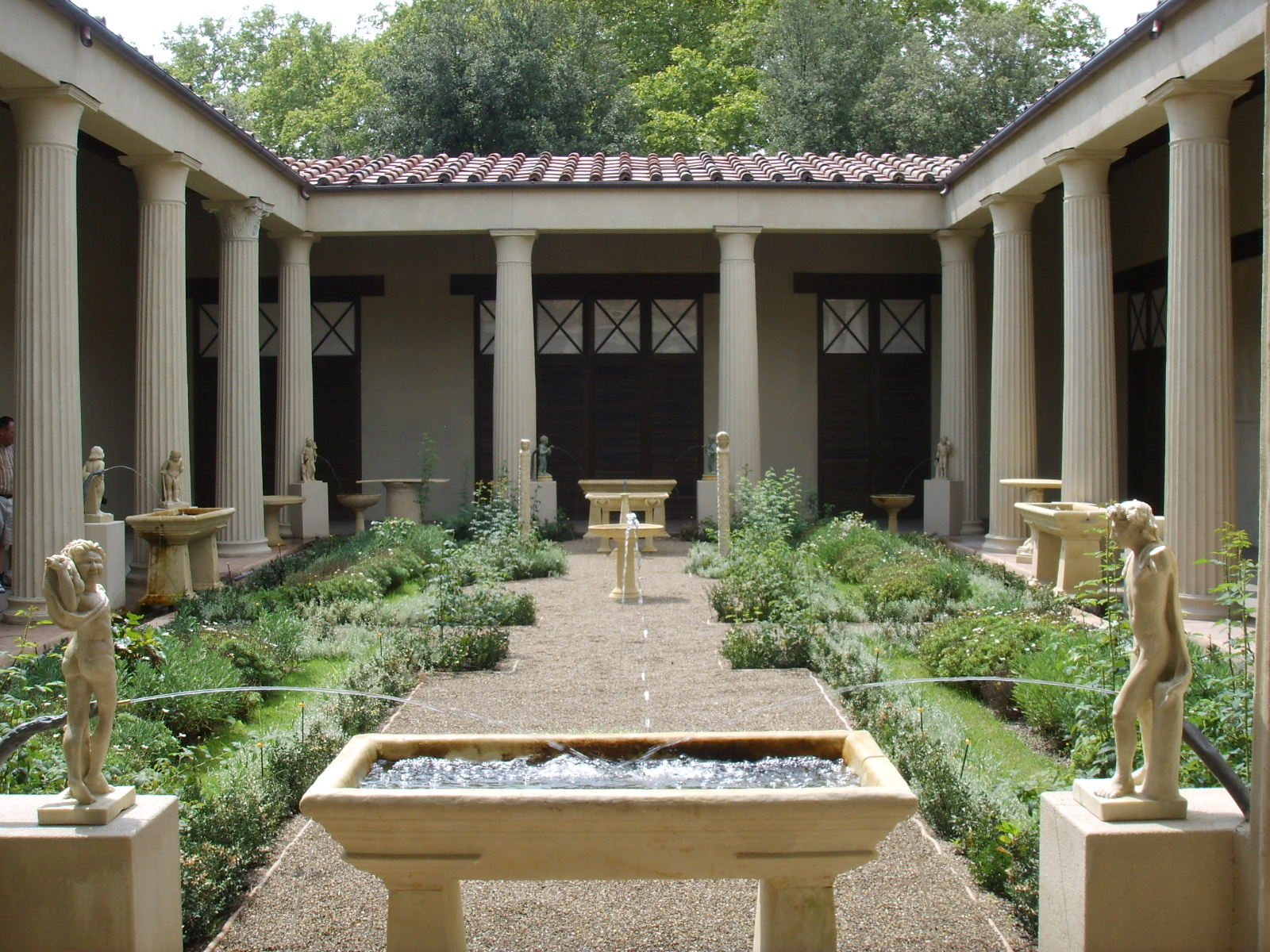
Reconstruction of the garden of the House of the Vettii in Pompeii

Roman gardens (Latin: horti) were greatly inspired by Greek gardens and were usually in the peristyles. The administrators of the Roman Empire (c.100 BC – AD 500) actively exchanged information on agriculture, horticulture, animal husbandry, hydraulics, and botany. The Gardens of Lucullus (Horti Lucullani) on the Pincian Hill at the edge of Rome introduced the Persian garden to Europe, around 60 BC. The garden was a place of peace and tranquillity, a refuge from urban life, and a place filled with religious and symbolic meanings. As Roman culture developed and became increasingly influenced by foreign civilizations through trade, the use of gardens expanded and gardens ultimately thrived in Ancient Rome.

The principle styles of the giardino all'italiana emerged from the rediscovery by Renaissance scholars of Roman models. They were inspired by the descriptions of Roman gardens given by Ovid in his Metamorphoses, in the letters of Pliny the Younger, in Pliny the Elder's Naturalis Historia, and in Rerum Rusticanum by Varro, all of which gave detailed and lyrical description of the gardens of Roman villas.

Pliny the Younger described his life at his villa at Laurentum: " ...a good life and a genuine one, which is happy and honourable, more rewarding than any "business" can be. You should take the first opportunity to leave the din, the futile bustle and useless occupations of the city and devote yourself to literature or to leisure". The purpose of a garden, according to Pliny, was otium, which could be translated as seclusion, serenity, or relaxation. A garden was a place to think, read, write and relax.

Pliny described shaded paths bordered with hedges, ornamental parterres, fountains, and trees and bushes trimmed to geometric or fantastic shapes; all features which would become part of the future Renaissance garden.

=== Italian Medieval gardens ===
Italian Medieval gardens were enclosed by walls, and were devoted to growing vegetables, fruits and medicinal herbs, and, in the case of monastic gardens, for silent meditation and prayer. Generally, monastic garden types consisted of kitchen gardens, infirmary gardens, cemetery orchards, cloister garths, and vineyards. Individual monasteries might also have had a "green court", a plot of grass and trees where horses could graze, as well as a cellarer's garden or private gardens for obedientiaries, monks who held specific posts within the monastery.

=== Italian Renaissance gardens ===
The Italian Renaissance garden emerged in the late fifteenth century at villas in Rome and Florence, inspired by classical ideals of order and beauty, and intended for the pleasure of the view of the garden and the landscape beyond, for contemplation, and for the enjoyment of the sights, sounds and smells of the garden itself.

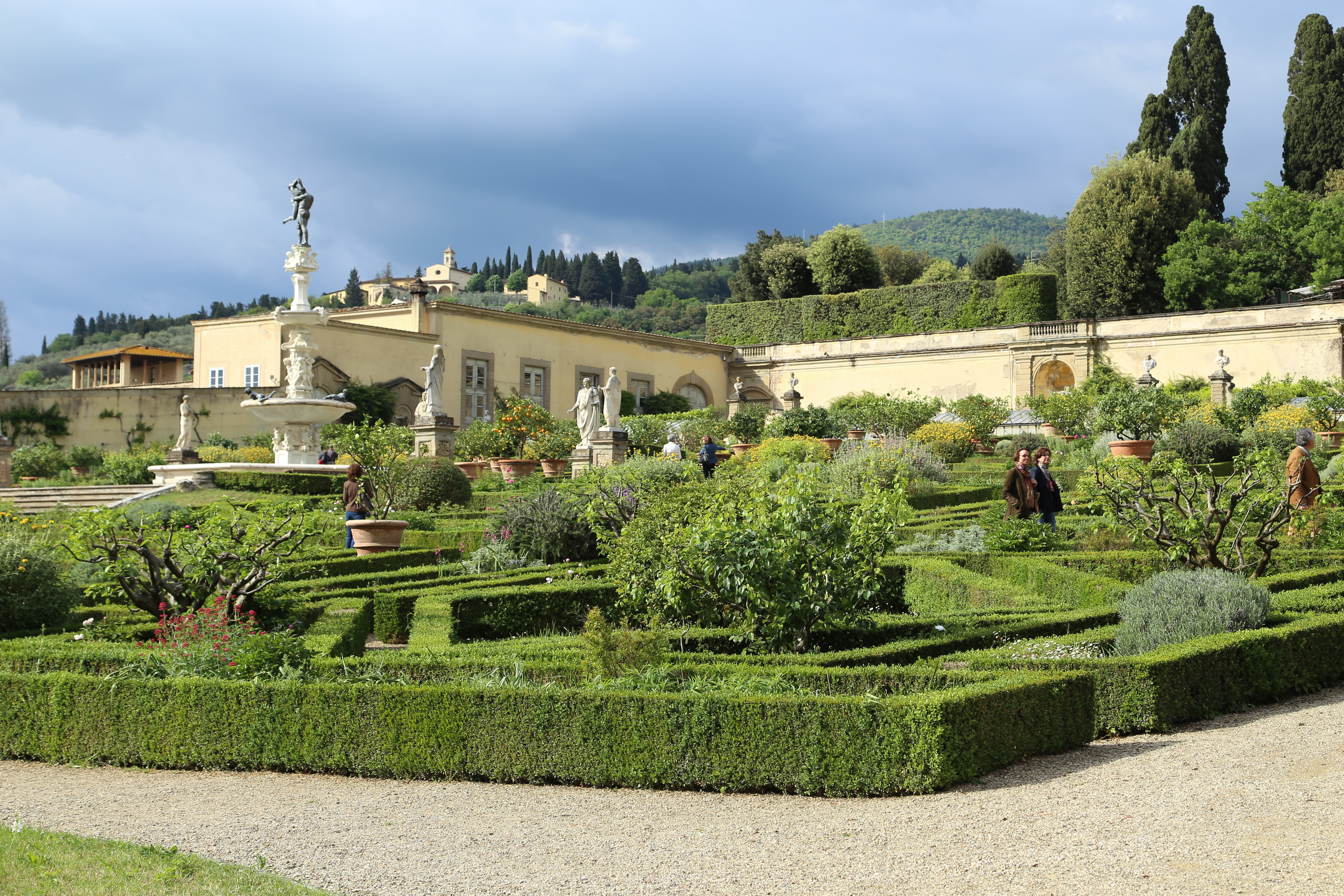
Fountain of Heracles and Antaeus in the gardens of the Villa di Castello, Florence

During the late Renaissance, gardens became larger and even more symmetrical, and were filled with fountains, statues, grottoes, water organs and other features designed to delight their owners and amuse and impress visitors.

While the early Italian Renaissance gardens were designed for contemplation and pleasure with tunnels of greenery, trees for shade, an enclosed giardino segreto (secret garden) and fields for games and amusements, the Medici, the ruling dynasty of Florence, used gardens to demonstrate their own power and magnificence. "During the first half of the sixteenth century, magnificence came to be perceived as a princely virtue, and all over the Italian peninsula architects, sculptors, painters, poets, historians and humanist scholars were commissioned to concoct a magnificent image for their powerful patrons." The central fountain at Villa di Castello featured a statue of Hercules, symbolizing Cosimo de' Medici, the ruler of Florence, and the fish-tailed goat that was an emblem of the Medici; the garden represented the power, wisdom, order, beauty and glory that the Medici had brought to Florence.

== Italian villas with notable gardens ==
Here follows a curated selection of gardens that makes no claim to be complete

=== The Medici Villa at Fiesole (1455–1461) ===
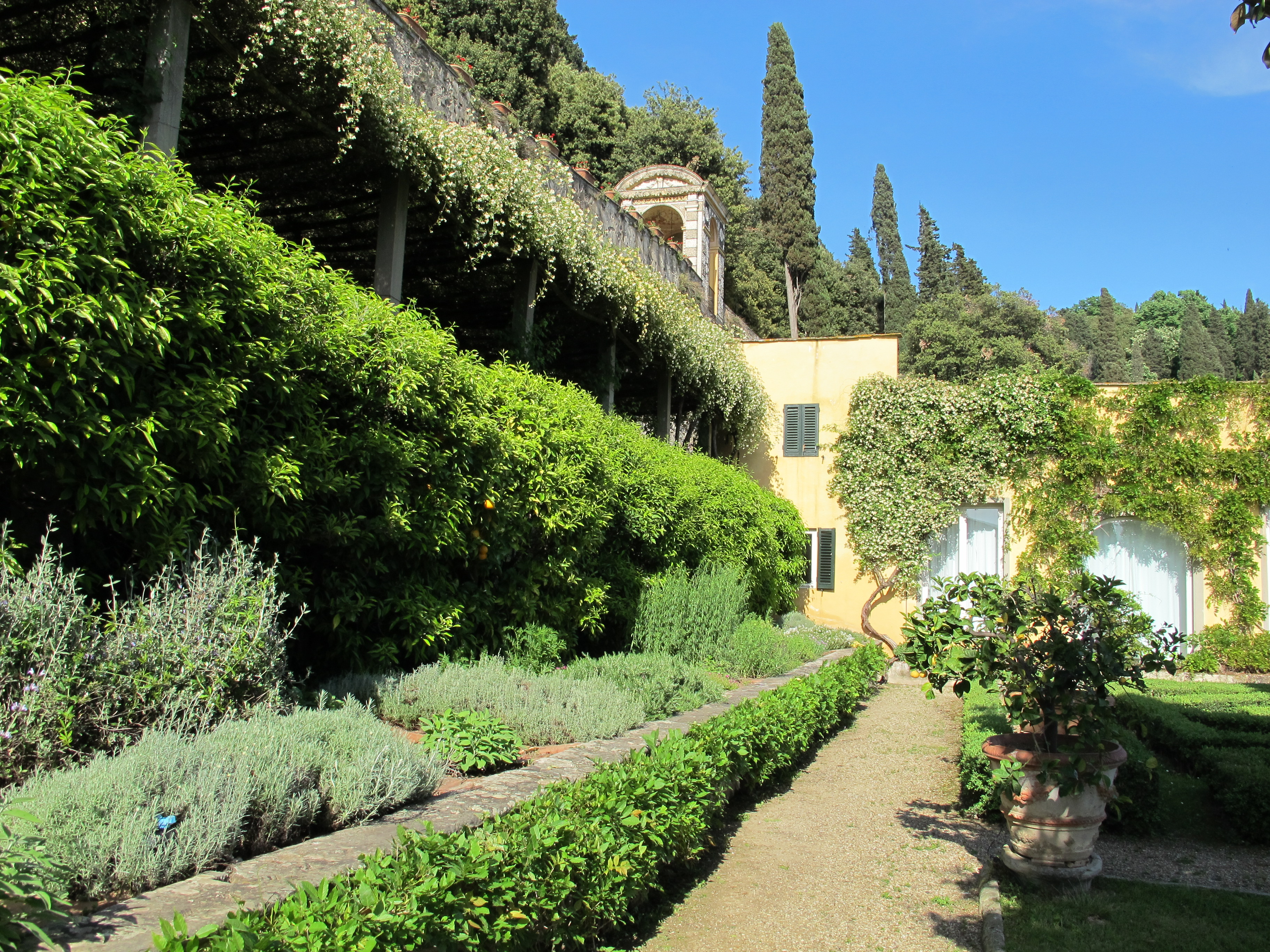
Villa Medici in Fiesole, the site of the oldest existing Italian Renaissance garden.

The oldest existing Italian Renaissance garden is at the Villa Medici in Fiesole, north of Florence. It was created sometime between 1455 and 1461 by Giovanni de' Medici (1421–1463) the son of Cosimo de' Medici, the founder of the Medici dynasty. Unlike other Medici family villas that were located on flat farmland, this villa was located on a rocky hillside with a view over Florence.

The Villa Medici followed Leon Battista Alberti's precepts that a villa should have a view "that overlooks the city, the owner's land, the sea or a great plain, and familiar hills and mountains", and that the foreground have "the delicacy of gardens". The garden has two large terraces, one at the ground floor level and the other at the level of the first floor. From the reception rooms on the first floor, guests could go out to the loggia and from there to the garden so the loggia was a transition space connecting the interior with the exterior. Unlike later gardens, the Medici Villa did not have a grand staircase or other feature to link the two levels.

The garden was inherited by his nephew, Lorenzo de' Medici, who made it a meeting place for poets, artists, writers and philosophers. In 1479, the poet Agnolo Poliziano, tutor to the Medici children, described the garden in a letter: "..Seated between the sloping sides of the mountains we have here water in abundance and being constantly refreshed with moderate winds find little inconvenience from the glare of the sun. As you approach the house it seems embosomed in the wood, but when you reach it you find it commands a full prospect of the city".

=== The Palazzo Piccolomini at Pienza, Tuscany (1459) ===
Gardens of the Palazzo Piccolomini, Pienza

The Palazzo Piccolomini at Pienza, was built by Enea Silvio Piccolomini, who was Pope from 1458 to 1464, under the name of Pius II. He was a scholar of Latin and wrote extensively on education, astronomy and social culture. In 1459, he constructed a palace for himself and his Cardinals and court in his small native town of Pienza. Like the Villa Medici, a major feature of the house was the commanding view to be had from the loggia over the valley, the Val d'Orcia, to the slopes of Monte Amiata. Closer to the house, there were terraces with geometric flowerbeds surrounding fountains and ornamented with bushes trimmed into cones and spheres similar to the garden of Pliny described in Alberti's De re aedificatoria. The garden was designed to open to the town, the palace and the view.

=== The Cortile del Belvedere in the Vatican Palace, Rome (1504–1513) ===
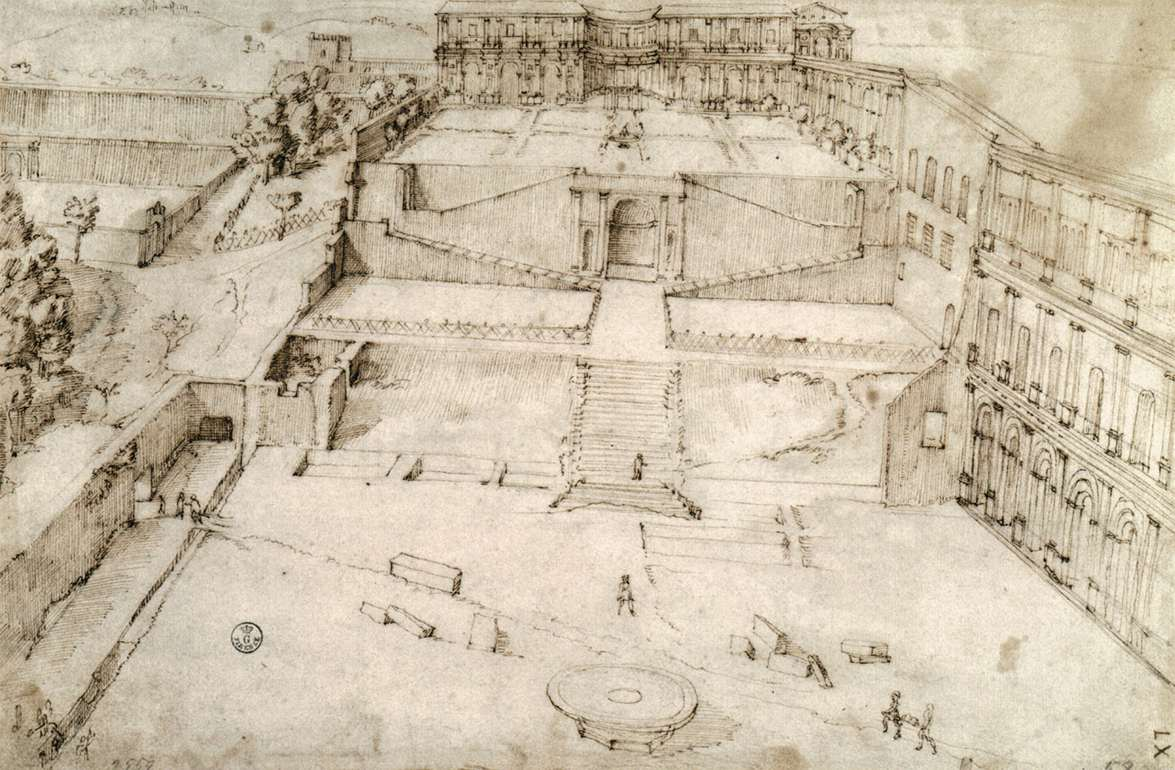
Bramante's design for the Belvedere Courtyard, Rome

In 1504 Pope Julius II commissioned the architect Donato Bramante to recreate a classical Roman pleasure garden in the space between the old papal Vatican palace in Rome and the nearby Villa Belvedere. His model was the ancient Sanctuary of Fortuna Primigenia at Palestrina or ancient Praeneste, and he used the classical ideals of proportion, symmetry and perspective in his design. He created a central axis to link the two buildings, and a series of terraces connected by double ramps, modelled after those at Palestrina. The terraces were divided into squares and rectangles by paths and flowerbeds, and served as an outdoor setting for Pope Julius's extraordinary collection of classical sculpture, which included the famous Laocoön and the Apollo Belvedere. The heart of the garden was a courtyard surrounded by a three-tiered loggia, which served as a theater for entertainments. A central exedra formed the dramatic conclusion of the long perspective up the courtyard, ramps and terraces.

The Venetian Ambassador described the Cortile del Belvedere in 1523: "One enters a very beautiful garden, of which half is filled with growing grass and bays and mulberries and cypresses, while the other half is paved with squares of bricks laid upright, and in every square a beautiful orange tree grows out of the pavement, of which there are a great many, arranged in perfect order....On one side of the garden is a most beautiful loggia, at one end of which is a lovely fountain that irrigates the orange trees and the rest of the garden by a little canal in the center of the loggia."

Unfortunately, the construction of the Vatican Library in the late sixteenth century across the centre of the cortile means that Bramante's design is now obscured but his ideas of proportion, symmetry and dramatic perspectives were used in many of the great gardens of the Italian Renaissance.

=== The Villa Madama, Rome (1516) ===
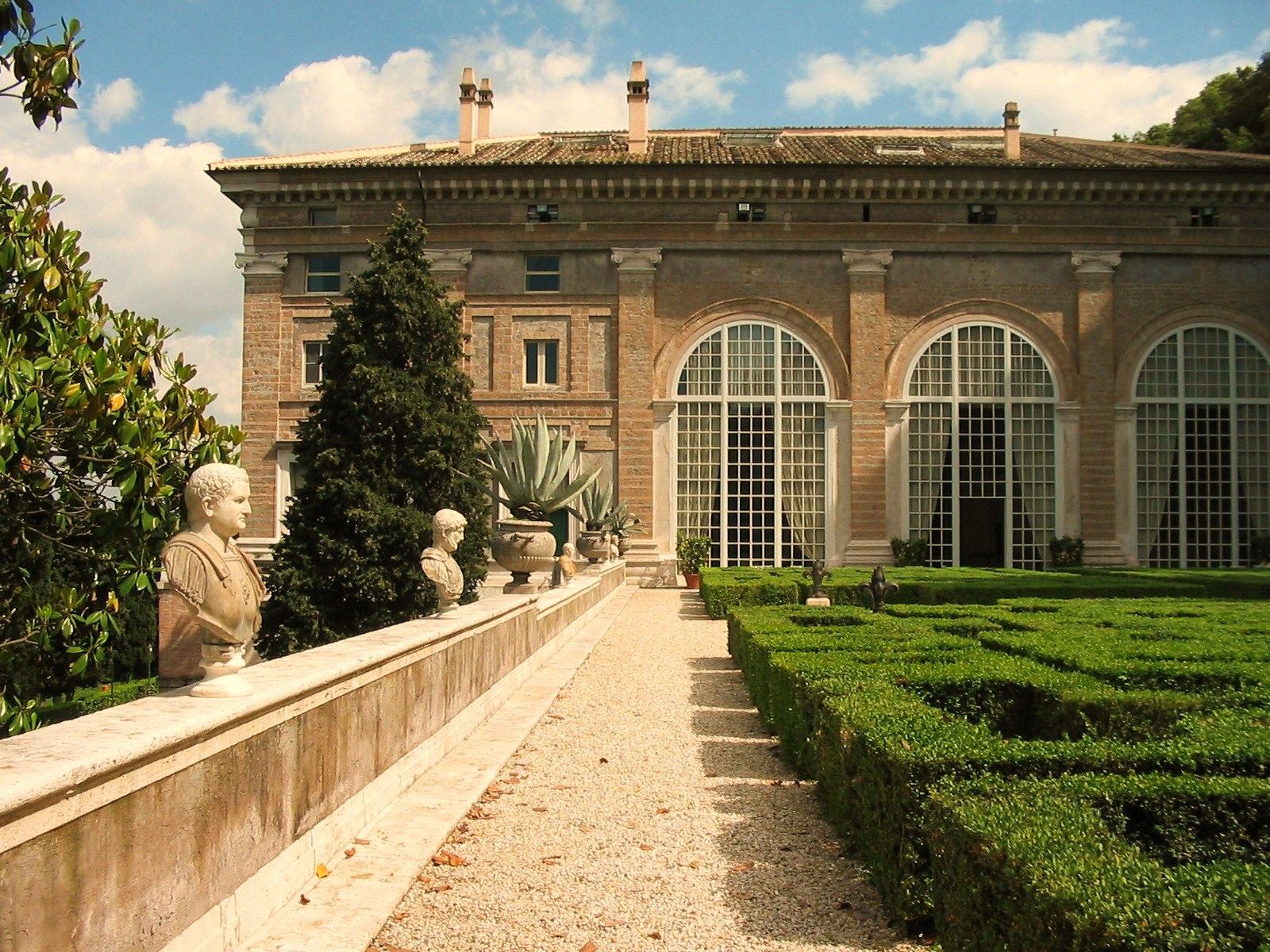
Villa Madama, Rome

The Villa Madama, situated on the slopes of Monte Mario and overlooking Rome, was begun by Pope Leo X and continued by Cardinal Giulio de' Medici (1478–1534). In 1516 Leo X gave the commission to Raphael who was at that time the most famous artist in Rome. Using the ancient text of De Architectura by Vitruvius and the writings of Pliny the Younger, Raphael imagined his own version of an ideal classical villa and garden. His villa had a great circular courtyard, and was divided into a winter apartment and a summer apartment. Passages led from the courtyard to the great loggia from which views could be gained of the garden and Rome. A round tower on the east side was intended as garden room in winter, warmed by the sun coming through glazed windows. The villa overlooked three terraces, one a square, one a circle, and one an oval. The top terrace was to be planted in chestnut trees and firs while the lower terrace was intended for plant beds.

Work on the Villa Madama stopped in 1520 after the death of Raphael but was then continued by other artists until 1534. They finished one-half of the villa including half of the circular courtyard, and the northwest loggia that was decorated with grotesque frescoes by Giulio Romano and stucco by Giovanni da Udine. Fine surviving features include a fountain of the head of an elephant by Giovanni da Udine and two gigantic stucco figures by Baccio Bandinelli at the entrance of the giardino segreto, the secret garden. The villa is now a state guest house for the Government of Italy.

=== Villa di Castello, Tuscany (1538) ===
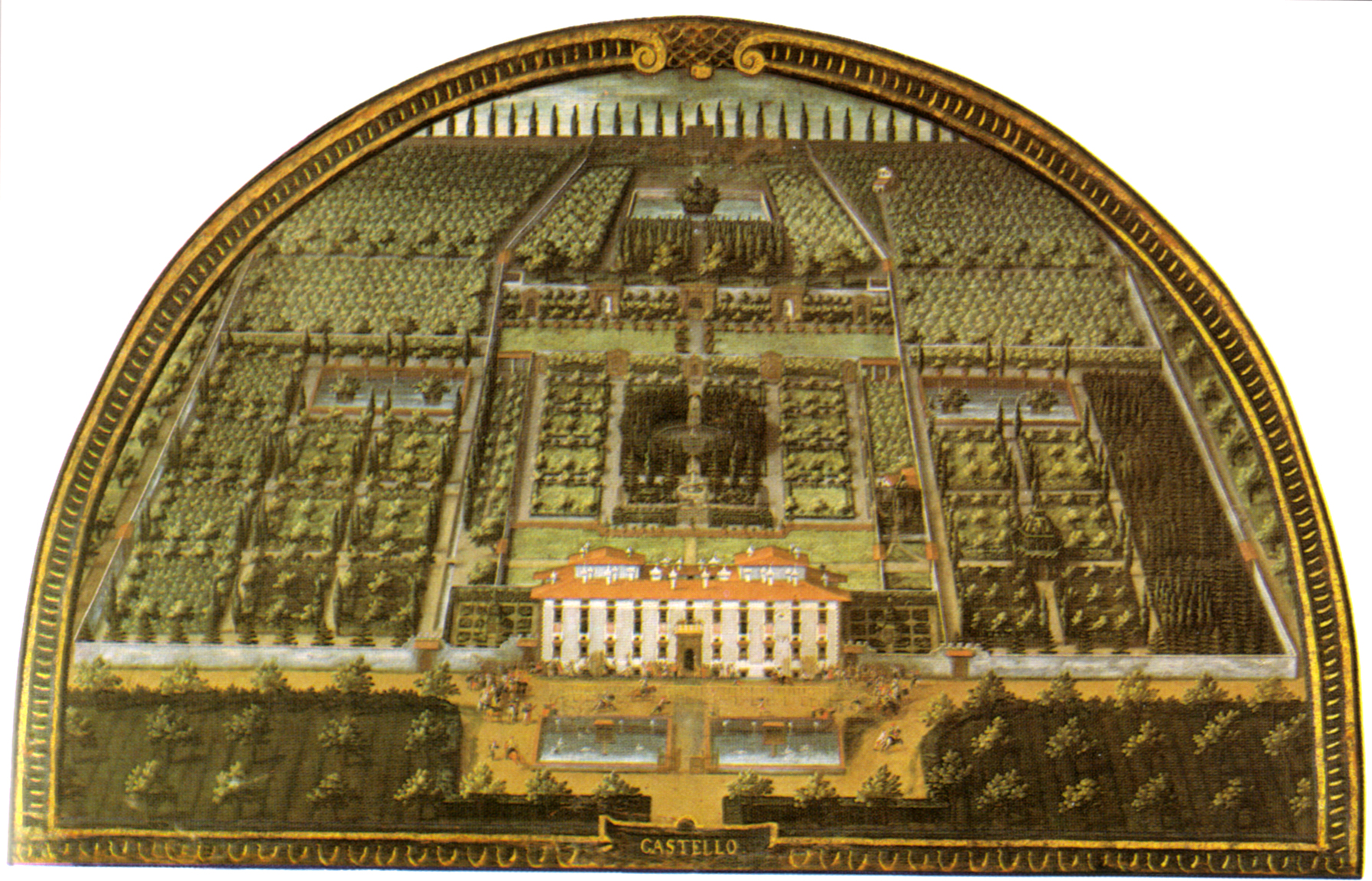
Lunette of Villa di Castello as it appeared in 1599, painted by Giusto Utens

Villa di Castello was the project of Cosimo de' Medici, first Duke of Tuscany, begun when he was only seventeen. It was designed by Niccolò Tribolo who designed two other gardens: the Giardino dei Semplici (1545) and the Boboli Gardens (1550) for Cosimo. The garden was laid out on a gentle slope between the villa and the hill of Monte Morello. Tribolo first built a wall across the slope, dividing it into an upper garden filled with orange trees, and a lower garden that was subdivided into garden rooms with walls of hedges, rows of trees and tunnels of citrus trees and cedars. A central axis, articulated by a series of fountains, extended from the villa up to the base of Monte Morello. In this arrangement, the garden had both grand perspectives and enclosed, private spaces.

The lower garden had a large marble fountain that was meant to be seen against a backdrop of dark cypresses, with figures of Hercules and Antaeus. Just above this fountain, in the center of the garden, was a hedge maze formed by cypress, laurel, myrtle, roses and box hedges. Concealed in the middle of the maze was another fountain, with a statue of Venus. Around this fountain, Cosimo had bronze pipes installed under the tiles for giochi d'acqua ("water games"), which were concealed conduits which could be turned on with a key to drench unsuspecting guests. Another unusual feature was a tree house concealed in an ivy-covered oak tree, with a square dining room inside the tree.

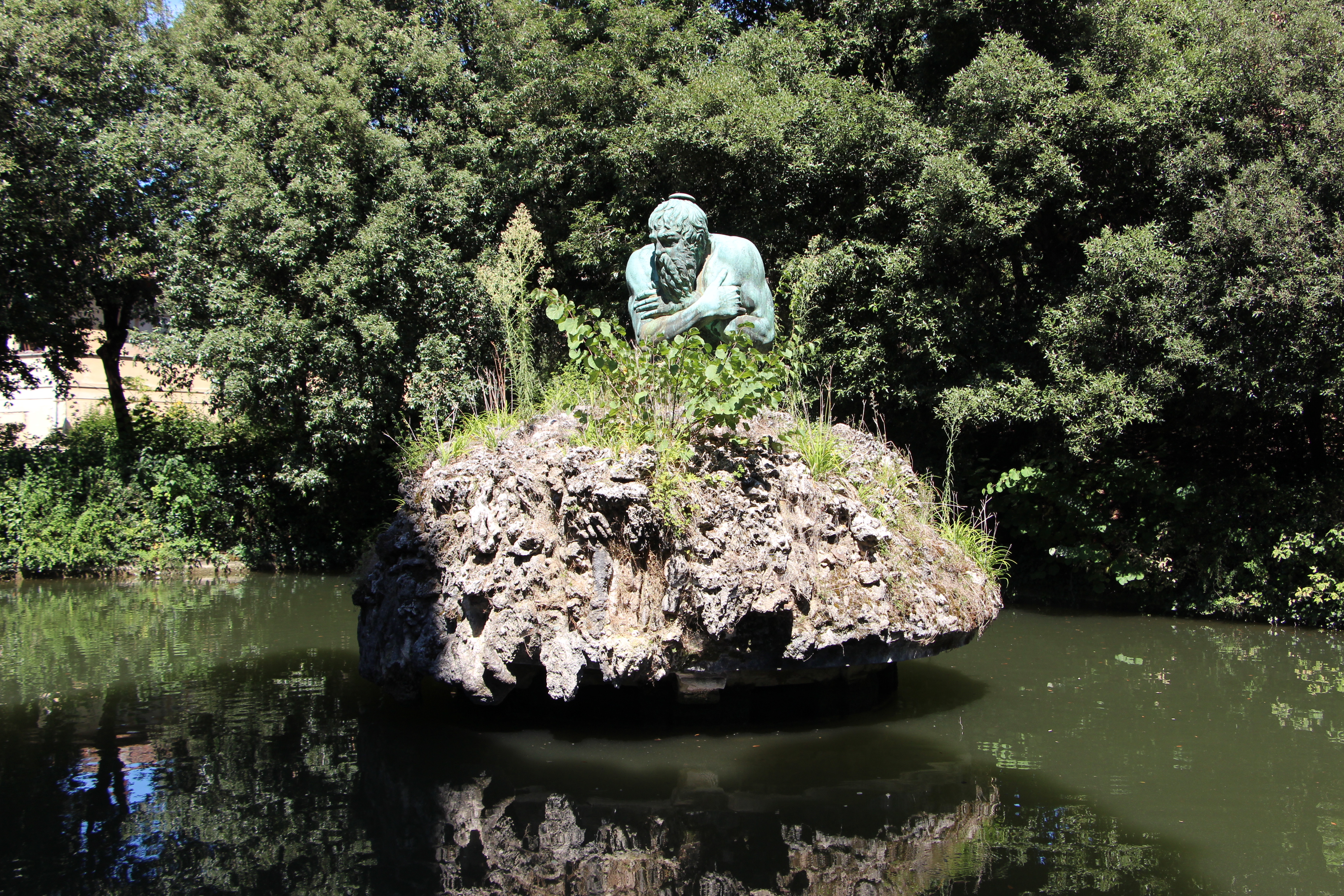
Fountain of January by Bartolomeo Ammannati

At the far end of the garden and set against a wall, Tribolo created an elaborate grotto, decorated with mosaics, pebbles, sea shells, imitation stalactites, and niches with groups of statues of domestic and exotic animals and birds, many with real horns, antlers and tusks. The animals symbolized the virtues and accomplishments of past members of Medici family. Water flowed from the beaks, wings and claws of the animals into marble basins below each niche. A gate could close suddenly behind visitors, and they would be soaked by hidden fountains.

Above the grotto, on the hillside, was small woodland, or bosco, with a pond in the centre. In the pond is a bronze statue of a shivering giant, with cold water running down over his head, which represents either the month of January or the Apennine Mountains.

When the last of the Medici died in 1737, the garden began to be altered by its new owners, the House of Lorraine; the maze was demolished and the statue of Venus was moved to the Villa La Petraia, but long before then, the garden had been described by many ambassadors and foreign visitors and had become famous throughout Europe. Its principles of perspective, proportion and symmetry, its geometric planting beds and rooms with walls of trees and hedges, were adapted in both the gardens of the French Renaissance and the garden à la française which followed.

=== Villa d'Este at Tivoli (1550–1572) ===
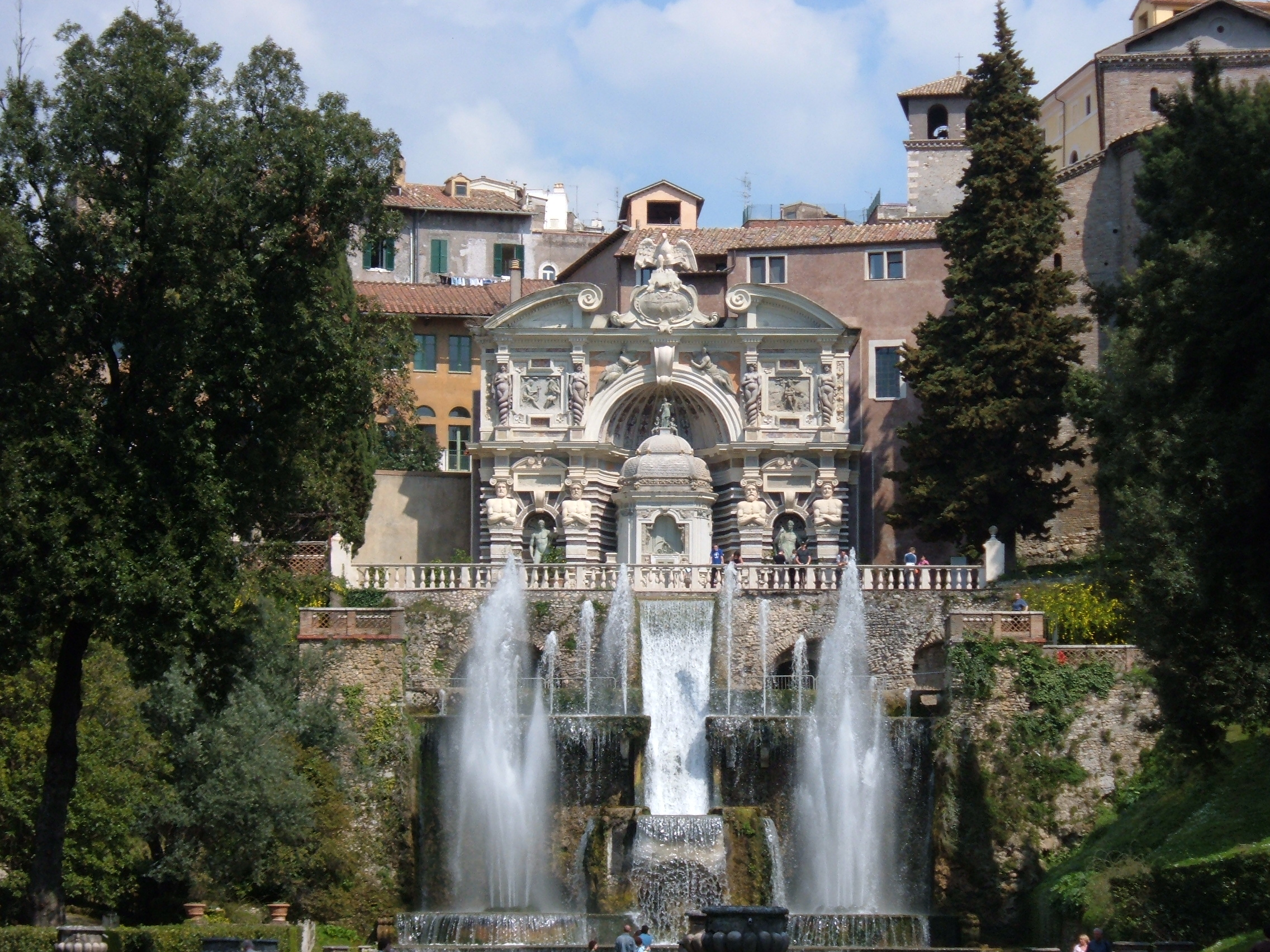
The Neptune Fountain (foreground) and Water Organ (background) in the gardens at the Villa d'Este

The Villa d'Este is a villa situated at Tivoli, near Rome, Italy. Listed as a UNESCO world heritage site, it is a fine example of Renaissance architecture and the Italian Renaissance garden.

The garden plan is laid out on a central axis with subsidiary cross-axes of carefully varied character, refreshed by some five hundred jets in fountains, pools and water troughs. The copious water is supplied by the Aniene, which is partly diverted through the town, a distance of a kilometer, and by the Rivellese spring, which supplies a cistern under the villa's courtyard. The garden is now part of the Grandi Giardini Italiani.

The Villa's uppermost terrace ends in a balustraded balcony at the left end, with a sweeping view over the plain below. Symmetrical double flights of stairs flanking the central axis lead to the next garden terrace, with the Grotto of Diana, richly decorated with frescoes and pebble mosaic to one side and the central Fontana del Bicchierone ("Fountain of the Great Cup") loosely attributed to Bernini, where water issues from a seemingly natural rock into a scrolling shell-like cup.

The Villa d'Este at Tivoli is one of the grandest and best-preserved of the Italian Renaissance gardens. It was created by Cardinal Ippolito II d'Este, son of Alfonso I d'Este, the Duke of Ferrara, and Lucretia Borgia. He was made a Cardinal at the age of twenty-nine and became governor of Tivoli in 1550. To develop his residence, he took over a former Franciscan convent, and for the garden he bought the adjoining steep hillside and the valley below. His chosen architect was Pirro Ligorio, who had been carrying out excavations for Ippolito at the nearby ruins of the ancient Villa Adriana, or Hadrian's Villa, the extensive country residence of the Emperor Hadrian that had numerous elaborate water features.

Ligorio created the garden as a series of terraces descending the steep hillside at the edge of the mountains overlooking the plain of Latium. The terraces were connected by gates and grand stairways starting from a terrace below the villa and traversing down to the Fountain of Dragons at the foot of the garden. The stairway was crossed by five traversal alleys on the different levels, which were divided into rooms by hedges and trellises covered with vines. At the crossing points of the stairway and the alleys there were pavilions, fruit trees, and aromatic plants. At the top, the promenade used by the Cardinal passed below the villa and led in one direction to the grotto of Diana, and in the other to the grotto of Aesclepius.

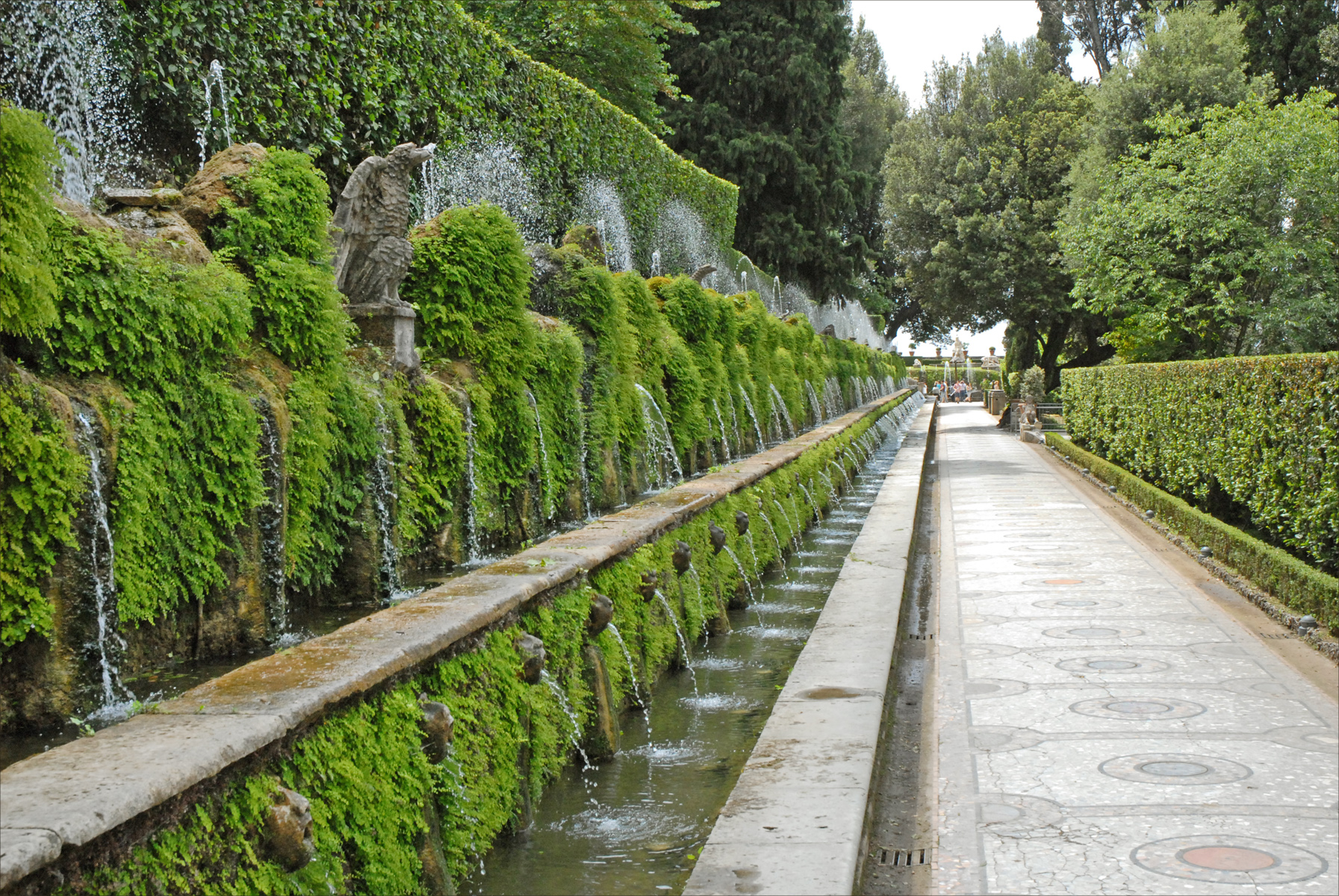
Alley of the hundred fountains, Villa d'Este

The glory of the Villa d'Este was the system of fountains, fed by two aqueducts that Ligorio constructed from the River Aniene. In the centre of the garden, the alley of one hundred fountains (which actually had two hundred fountains), crossed the hillside, connecting the Oval Fountain with the Fountain of Rome, which was decorated with models of the famous landmarks of Rome. On a lower level, another alley passed by the Fountain of Dragons and joined the fountain of Proserpine with the Fountain of the Owl. Still lower, an alley of fish ponds connected the Fountain of the Organ to the site of a proposed Fountain of Neptune.

Each fountain and path told a story, linking the d'Este family to the legends of Hercules and Hippolytus (or Ippolito), the mythical son of Theseus and the Queen of the Amazons. The central axis led to the Fountain of Dragons, which illustrated one of the labors of Hercules, and three other statues of Hercules were found in the garden. The myth of Ippolito, the mythical namesake of the owner, was illustrated by two grottos, that of Aesclepius and Diana.

The Fountain of the Owl used a series of bronze pipes like flutes to make the sound of birds but the most famous feature of the garden was the great Organ Fountain. It was described by the French philosopher Montaigne, who visited the garden in 1580: "The music of the Organ Fountain is true music, naturally created...made by water which falls with great violence into a cave, rounded and vaulted, and agitates the air, which is forced to exit through the pipes of an organ. Other water, passing through a wheel, strikes in a certain order the keyboard of the organ. The organ also imitates the sound of trumpets, the sound of cannon, and the sound of muskets, made by the sudden fall o water ...

The garden was substantially changed after the death of the Cardinal and in the 17th century, and many statues were sold, but the basic features remain, and the Organ fountain has recently been restored and plays music once again.

=== Villa Della Torre (1559) ===
The Villa Della Torre, built for Giulio Della Torre (1480–1563), a law professor and humanist scholar in Verona, was a parody of the classical rules of Vitruvius; the peristyle of the building was in the perfectly harmonious Vitruvius style, but some of the stones were rough-cut and of different sizes and decorated with masks which sprayed water, which jarred the classical harmony. "The building was deformed: it seemed to be caught in a strange, amorphous condition, somewhere crude rustic simplicity and classical perfection.". The fireplaces inside were in the forms of the mouths of gigantic masks. Outside, the garden was filled with disturbing architectural elements, including a grotto whose entrance represented the mouth of hell, with eyes that showed fires burning inside.

=== Sacro Bosco at Bomarzo, Lazio (1552–1585) ===
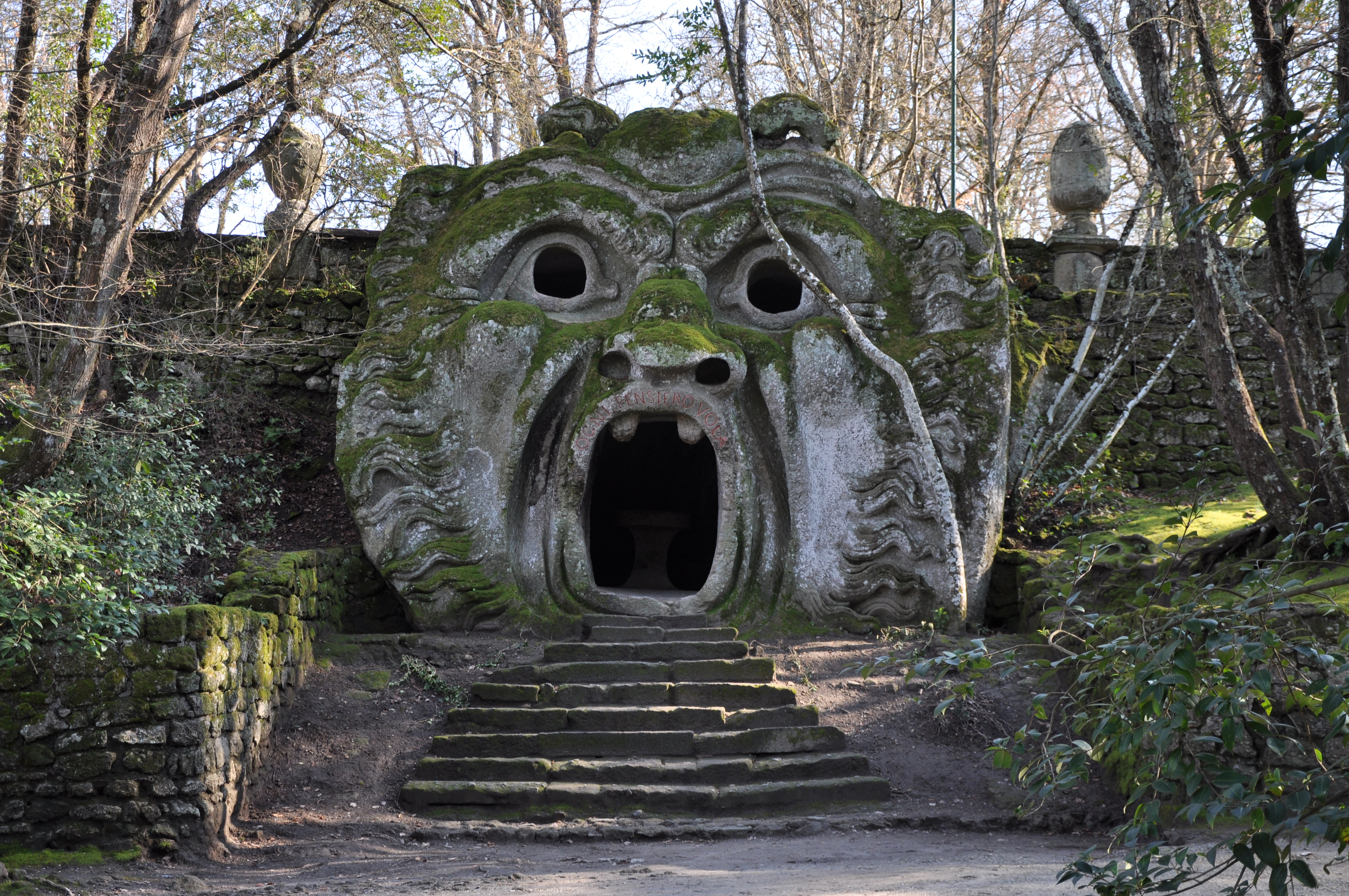
Sacro Bosco, Mouth of Orcus

Sacro Bosco ("Sacred Wood"), near the village of Bomarzo, is the most famous and extravagant of the Manieristic gardens. It was created for Pier Francesco Orsini (1523–1585). It was witty and irreverent, and violated all the rules of Renaissance gardens: it has no symmetry, no order, and no focal point. An inscription in the garden says: "You who have travelled the world in search of great and stupendous marvels, come here, where there are horrendous faces, elephants, lions, orcies and dragons."

The garden is filled with enormous statues, reached by wandering paths. It included a mouth of Death, a house that seemed to be falling over, fantastic animals and figures, many of them carved of rough volcanic rock in place in the garden. Some of the scenes were taken from the romantic epic poem Orlando Furioso by Ludovico Ariosto, others from works by Dante Alighieri and Francesco Petrarca. As one inscription in the garden notes, Sacro Bosco "resembles only itself, and nothing else".

=== Villa Lante ===
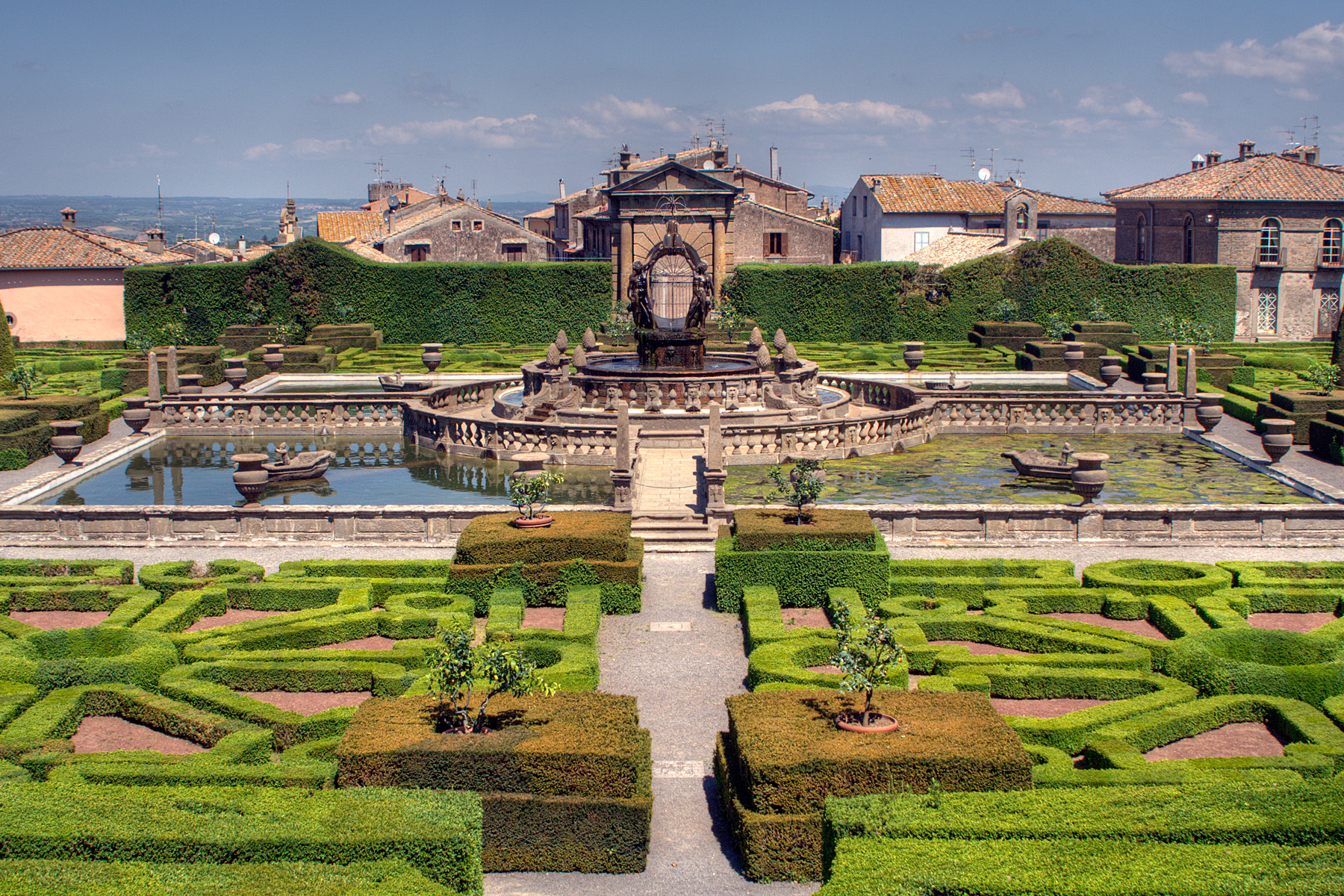
Gardens of the Villa Lante

Villa Lante at Bagnaia near Viterbo, attributed to Giacomo Barozzi da Vignola (there is no contemporary documentation) is, with the famous Gardens of Bomarzo, one of the most famous Italian 16th century Mannerist gardens of surprises. The first surprise to a visitor coming fresh from Villa Farnese at Caprarola is the difference between the two villas in the same area, period, architectural mannerist style and possibly by the same architect: there is little if any similarity. Villa Lante is arranged not as a dominant single building with adjacent gardens as at Caprarola, but with the gardens as the principal feature, set on the main axis and stepping up the hill slope as a series of terraces between the two small and relatively subservient casinos.

The villa is known as the "Villa Lante". However, it did not become known as this until the villa was passed to Ippolito Lante Montefeltro della Rovere, Duke of Bomarzo, in the 17th century, when it was already 100 years old.

=== Boboli Gardens ===
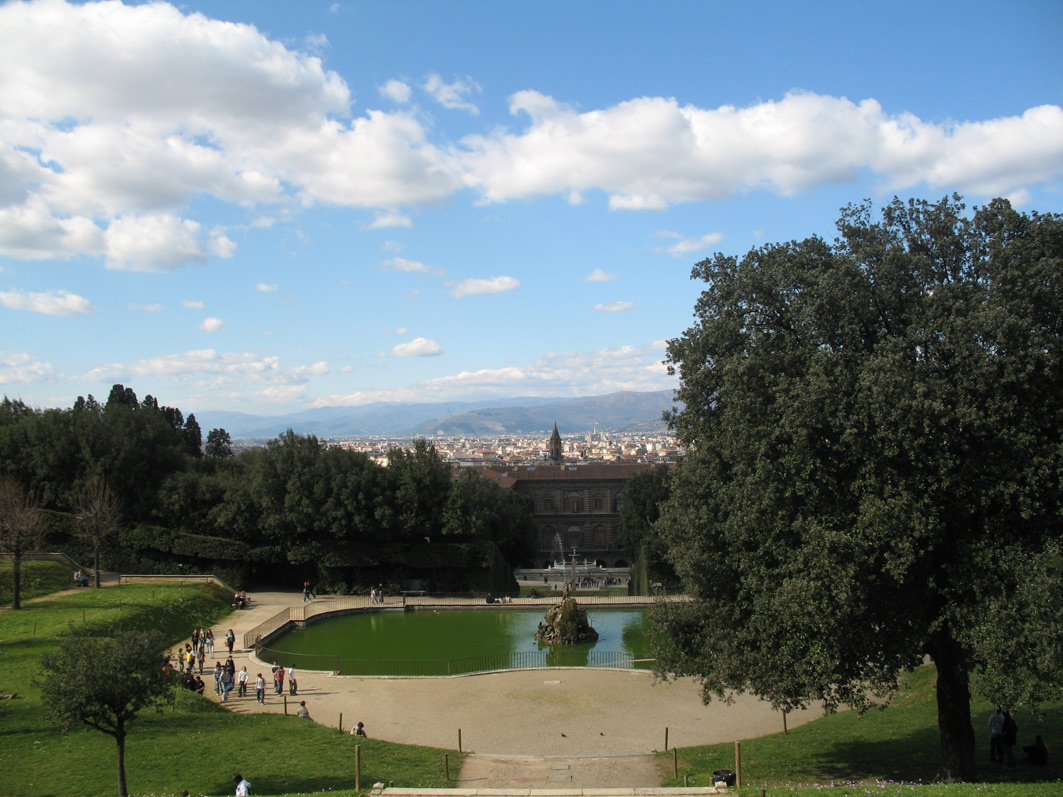
View of the Boboli Gardens

The Boboli Gardens, in Italian Giardino di Boboli, form a famous park in Florence, Italy, that is home to a distinguished collection of sculptures dating from the sixteenth through the eighteenth centuries, with some Roman antiquities.

The Gardens, behind the Pitti Palace, the main seat of the Medici grand dukes of Tuscany at Florence, are some of the first and most familiar formal sixteenth-century Italian gardens. The mid-16th-century garden style, as it was developed here, incorporated longer axial developments, wide gravel avenues, a considerable "built" element of stone, the lavish employment of statuary and fountains, and a proliferation of detail, coordinated in semi-private and public spaces that were informed by classical accents: grottos, nympheums, garden temples and the like. The openness of the garden, with an expansive view of the city, was unconventional for its time.

=== Giardino Giusti ===
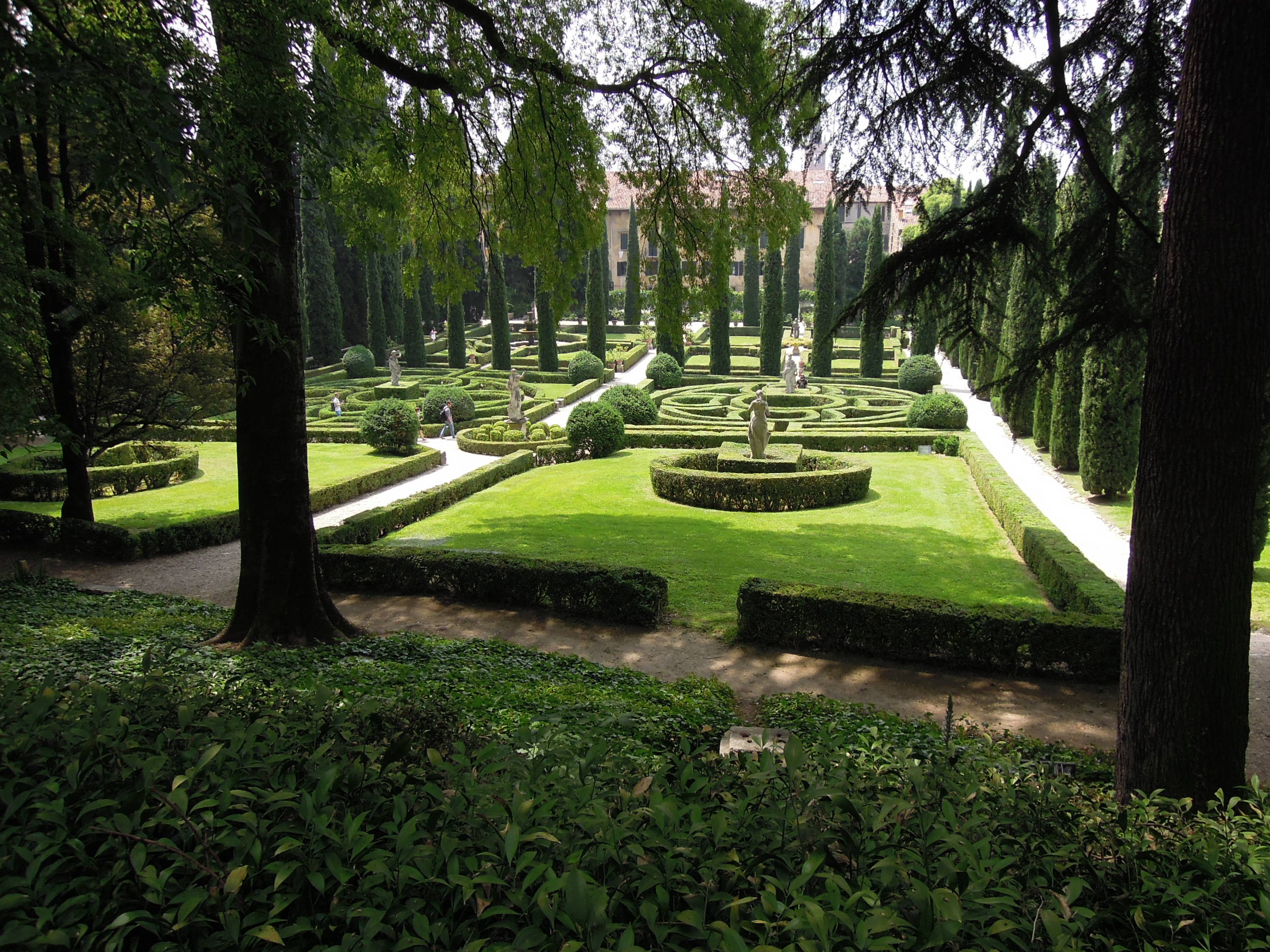
Giardini di Giusti

The Giardini di Giusti (Giusti Gardens) were planted in 1580 to surround the Palazzo Giusti, in Verona, Italy. They are regarded as some of the most beautiful Renaissance gardens in Europe.

=== Giardino Bardini ===
The Giardino Bardini is a Renaissance garden in Florence. Only opened recently to the public, it is relatively little-known. Access is gained via the Via de' Bardi, just over the road from the Museo Bardini in the Oltrarno district of the city, although the gardens exit onto the Costa di San Giorgio, onto which the Forte di Belevedere and the Giardino di Boboli connect in turn.

=== Villa Aldobrandini ===
Villa Aldobrandini is a villa in Frascati, Italy, property of Aldobrandini family. Also known as Belvedere for its charming location overlooking the whole valley up to Rome, it was built on the order of Cardinal Pietro Aldobrandini, Pope Clement VIII's nephew over a pre-existing edifice built by the Vatican prelate Alessandro Rufini in 1550.

The villa was rebuilt in the current form by Giacomo della Porta from 1598 to 1602, and then completed by Carlo Maderno and Giovanni Fontana. Particularly famous is the Teatro delle Acqua ("Water Theater"), by Carlo Maderno and Orazio Olivieri. Other noted villas with water-play structure are the Villa d'Este in Tivoli and Villa Torlonia also in Frascati.

=== Palace of Caserta ===
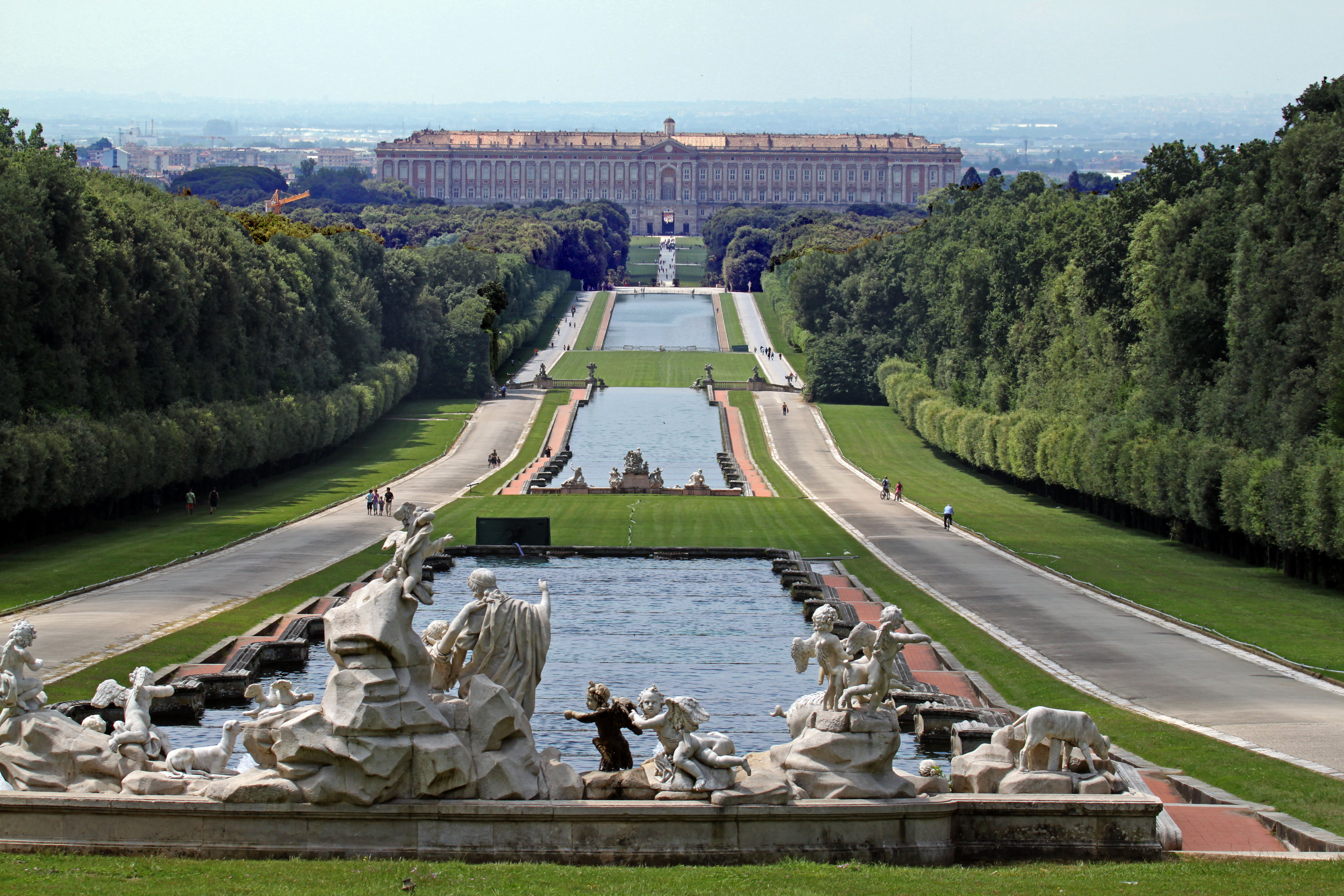
The Palace of Caserta

The Royal Palace of Caserta (Italian: Reggia di Caserta) is a former royal residence in Caserta, constructed for the Bourbon kings of Naples. The Royal Palace of Caserta is the largest former royal residence in the world.

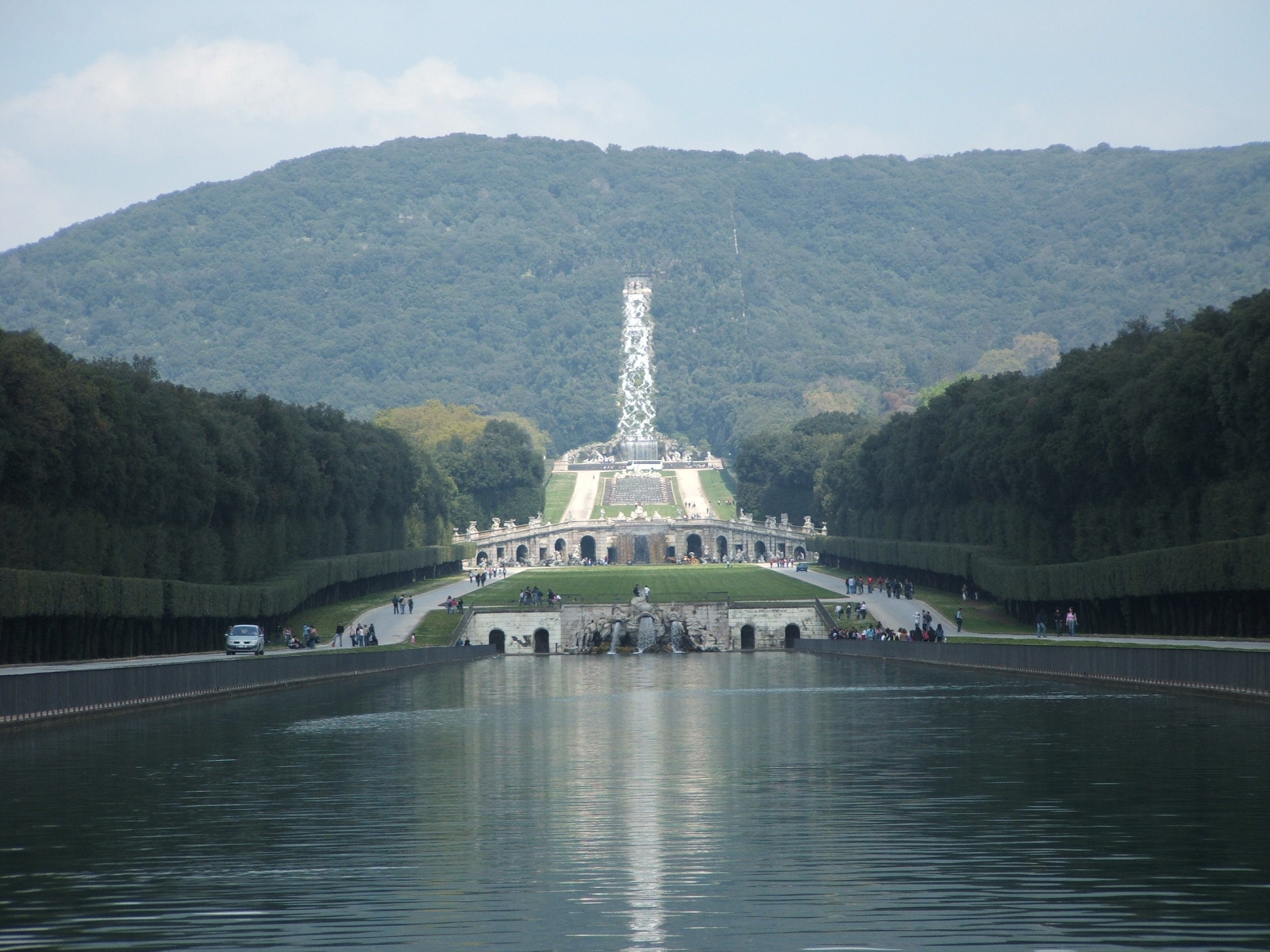
Palace of Caserta garden cascades

The garden, a typical example of the Baroque extension of formal vistas, stretch for 120 ha, partly on hilly terrain. It is inspired by the Gardens of Versailles, but it is commonly regarded as superior in beauty. The park starts from the back façade of the palace, flanking a long alley with artificial fountains and cascades. There is an English garden in the upper part designed in the 1780s by Carlo Vanvitelli and the London-trained plantsman-designer John Graeffer, recommended to Sir William Hamilton by Sir Joseph Banks. It is an early Continental example of an English garden in the svelte naturalistic taste of Capability Brown.

The fountains and cascades, each filling a vasca ("basin"), with architecture and hydraulics by Luigi Vanvitelli at intervals along a wide straight canal that runs to the horizon, rivalled those at Peterhof outside St. Petersburg. These include:

- the Fountain of Diana and Actaeon (sculptures by Paolo Persico, Brunelli, Pietro Solari);
- the Fountain of Venus and Adonis (1770–80);
- the Fountain of the Dolphins (1773–80);
- the Fountain of Aeolus;
- the Fountain of Ceres.

A large population of figures from classical antiquity were modelled by Gaetano Salomone for the gardens of the Reggia, and executed by large workshops.

=== Isola Bella (Lake Maggiore) ===
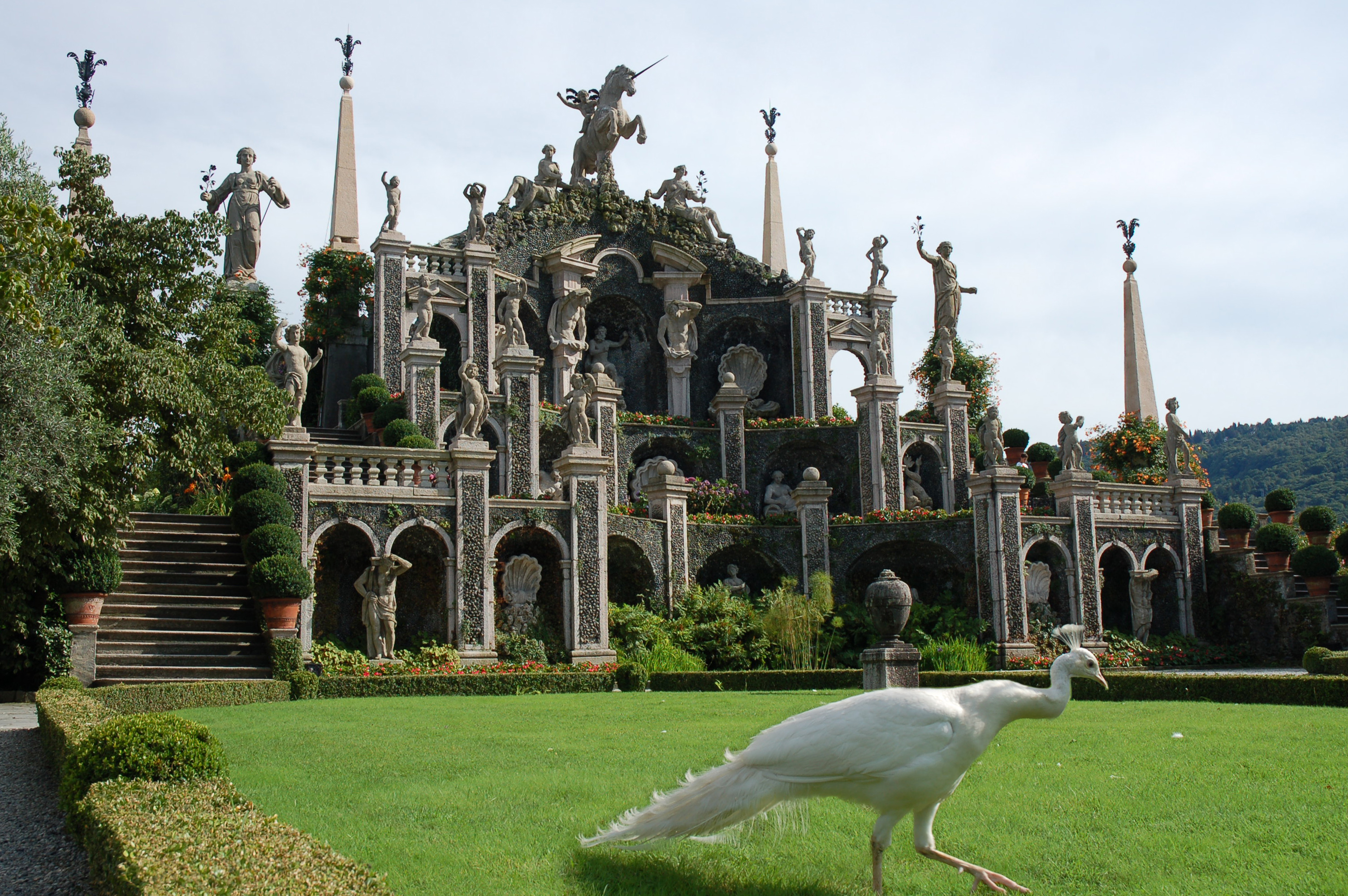
Isola Bella

The Isola Bella (Lago Maggiore) is one of the Borromean Islands of Lago Maggiore in north Italy. The island is situated in the Borromean Gulf 400 meters from the lakeside town of Stresa. Isola Bella is 320 meters long by 400 meters wide and is entirely occupied by the Palazzo Borromeo and its Italian garden.

== Influences on other gardening styles ==
=== French garden ===
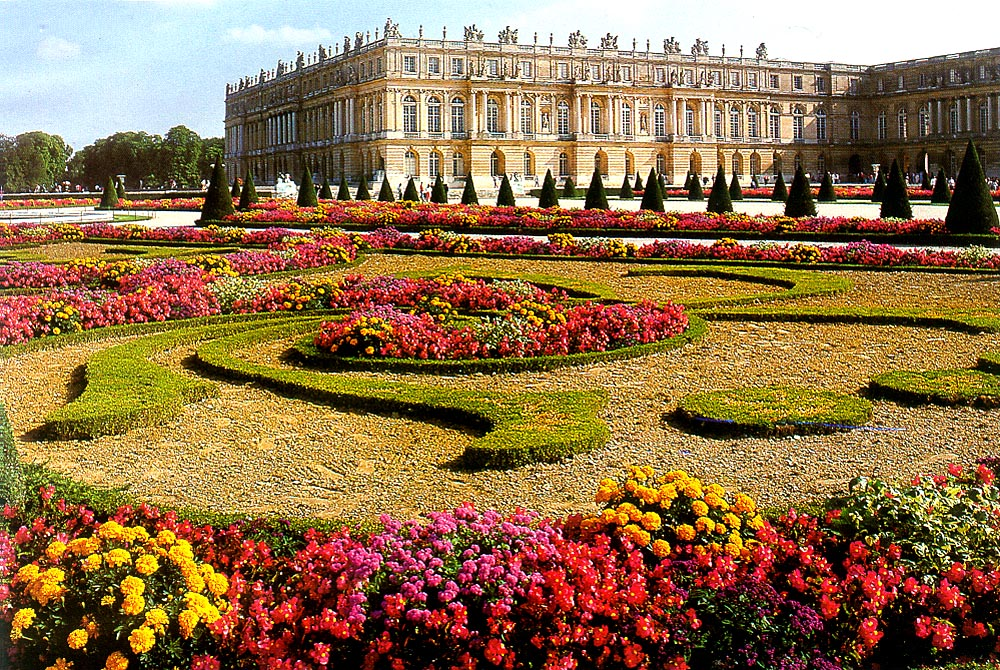
Gardens of the Palace of Versailles (Île-de-France). The geometrical patterns of the French formal garden were highly influenced by Italian styles.

The form of the French garden was strongly influenced by the Italian gardens of the Renaissance, and was largely fixed by the middle of the 17th century.

Following his campaign in Italy in 1495, where he saw the gardens and castles of Naples, King Charles VIII brought Italian craftsmen and garden designers, such as Pacello da Mercogliano, from Naples and ordered the construction of Italian-style gardens at his residence at the Château d'Amboise. His successor Henry II, who had also traveled to Italy and had met Leonardo da Vinci, had an Italian garden created nearby at the Château de Blois. Beginning in 1528, King Francis I of France created new gardens at the Palace of Fontainebleau, which featured fountains, parterres, a forest of pine trees brought from Provence and the first artificial grotto in France. The Château de Chenonceau had two gardens in the new style: one created for Diane de Poitiers in 1551, and a second for Catherine de Medici in 1560.

In 1536 the architect Philibert de l'Orme, upon his return from Rome, created the gardens of the Château d'Anet following the Italian rules of proportion. The carefully prepared harmony of Anet, with its parterres and surfaces of water integrated with sections of greenery, became one of the earliest and most influential examples of the classic French garden.

=== English garden ===
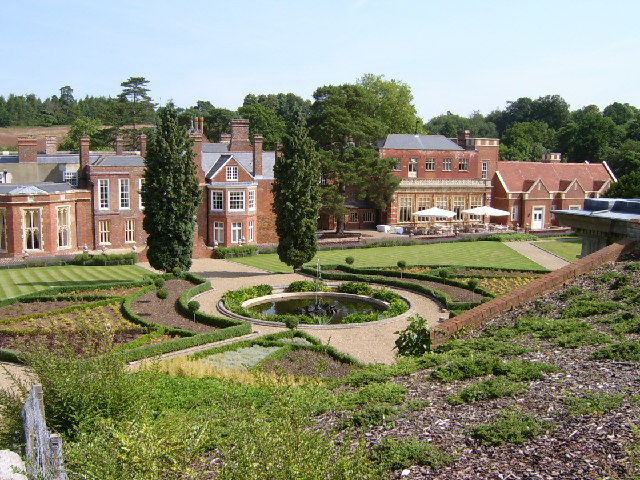
Wotton House and garden.

There is some Italian influence in the Elizabethan part of the garden at Hardwick Hall. An Italian garden at Wotton House in Surrey, planted between 1643 and 1652 by John Evelyn (1620–1706) and his elder brother George. is that house's best-known feature.

== Glossary of the Italian Renaissance garden ==
- Bosco sacro. Sacred wood. A grove of trees inspired by the groves where pagans would worship. In Renaissance and especially mannerist gardens, this section was filled with allegorical statues of animals, giants and legendary creatures.
- Fontaniere. Fountain-maker. A hydraulic engineer who designed the water system and fountains.
- Giardino segreto. The Secret Garden. An enclosed private garden within the garden, inspired by the cloisters of Medieval monasteries. A place for reading, writing or quiet conversations.
- Giochi d'acqua. Water tricks. Concealed fountains which drenched unsuspecting visitors.
- Semplici. "Simples," or medicinal plants and herbs.
