= Wotton, Surrey =

Village and parish in Surrey, England

Coordinates: 51.219°N 0.388°W

Wotton
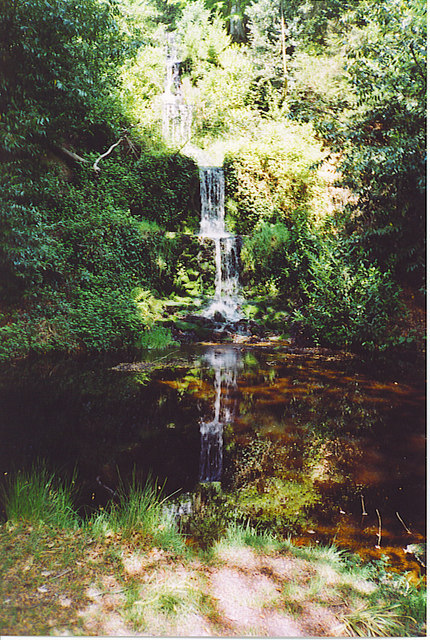
- Waterfall, Upper Tilling Valley

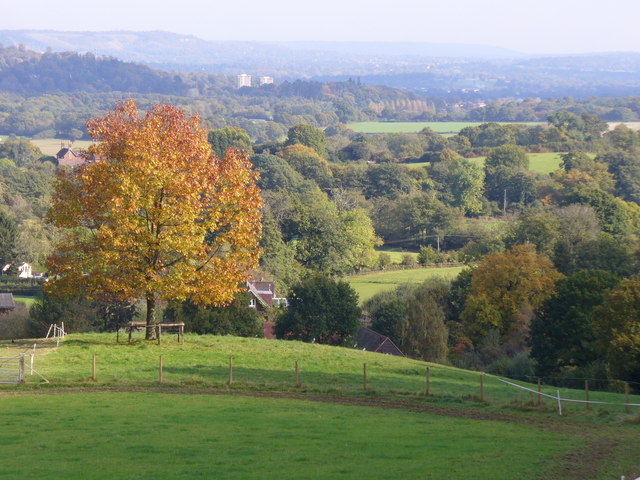
- View towards Dorking, the Cotmandene (right), Box Hill and the Botley Hill escarpment of the North Downs (left) from part of Wotton. This shows how the centre of Wotton is in a narrow part of the 'Vale of Holmesdale' which is not a single vale.

- Location within Surrey
- Area: 22.43 km^{2} (8.66 sq mi)
- Population: 583 (Civil Parish 2011 including Friday Street)
  - Density: 26/km^{2} (67/sq mi)
- OS grid reference: TQ1348
- Civil parish: Wotton
- District: Mole Valley
- Shire county: Surrey
- Region: South East
- Country: England
- Sovereign state: United Kingdom
- Post town: Dorking
- Postcode district: RH5
- Dialling code: 01306
- Police: Surrey
- Fire: Surrey
- Ambulance: South East Coast
- UK Parliament: Dorking and Horley

Wotton /ˈwʊtən/ is a well-wooded parish with one main settlement, a small village mostly south of the A25 between Guildford in the west and Dorking in the east. The nearest village with a small number of shops is Westcott. Wotton lies in a narrow valley, collecting the headwaters of the Tilling Bourne which then has its first combined flow in the Vale of Holmesdale. The parish is long north to south, reaching to the North Downs escarpment (and the North Downs Way) in the north to the escarpment of the Greensand Ridge at Leith Hill in the south.

Wotton Common forming the south of the parish is elevated woodland dotted with a few vernacular-style houses and has the county's only natural waterfall. The common's main settlement is Friday Street.

== Geography ==
The civil parish of Wotton is wholly within the Surrey Hills Area of Outstanding Natural Beauty and includes the small village itself, the smaller settlement of Friday Street, Leith Hill to the south and Ranmore Common to the north. Wotton lies in a small north then west facing valley, amassing the headwaters of the Tilling Bourne joining together in what becomes the west of the Vale of Holmesdale. The parish is long north to south, reaching to the North Downs escarpment (and the North Downs Way) in the north. To the south it reaches as far as the escarpment of the Greensand Ridge at Leith Hill.

== History ==
Wotton appears in Domesday Book of 1086 as Odetone. It was held by Osuuold (Oswold). Its domesday assets were: 5 hides; 1 mill worth 1s 8d, 10 ploughs, 3 acres (1.2 ha) of meadow, woodland and herbage worth 73 hogs. It rendered £7 and a half (10s) per year to its overlords, a modest drop since the Norman Conquest.

The English Place-Name Society volume on Surrey (published 1934) records early spellings of Wotton as Wodeton (in 1235, 1258, 1291, 1304, 1317 and 1355), Wudeton (in 1235, 1242 and 1259), Woddeton (in 1304), Woditon (1279) and Wodyton (1443); and variants such as Wodenton (1270) Wodinton (1276 and 1302), Wodynton (1355), Wodyngton (1292, 1380, 1382 and 1456) and Wodington (1324). In 1548 it was "Wodyngeton alias Wotton" and in 1610 it was "Wutton". The same source explains the name as meaning "Farm by the wood", the first element being "Wood" and the final element being "tun" or farmstead.

=== Wotton House ===
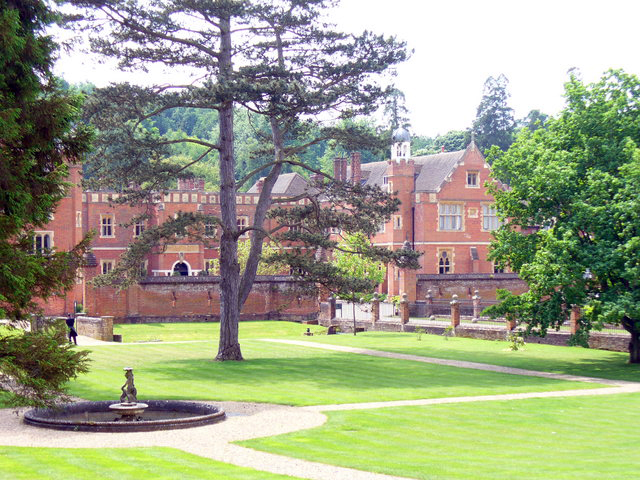
Wotton House today

John Evelyn, the diarist was born at Wotton House in 1620. In 1694 he moved in as the main legatee. After the Evelyn family relinquished occupation, Wotton House was leased as a training college for the Fire Service from 1947 to 1981.

After being empty for nearly 13 years, it was converted into a hotel and conference centre with over 100 bedrooms.

Three areas of the house remain in the original layout and architectural style, and the hotel has grounds of historic importance from the 17th century. Its II* grade is above the grade that many comparable parks achieve and its garden and architecture are well documented.

In the grounds on the South side are two grottos. There is also an orangery with decorative parapet and banded piers, terracotta decorations on brickwork, octagonal turrets and stacks, winged gryphons on the porch and Jean Derraux Chinese panels.

== Parish Church ==
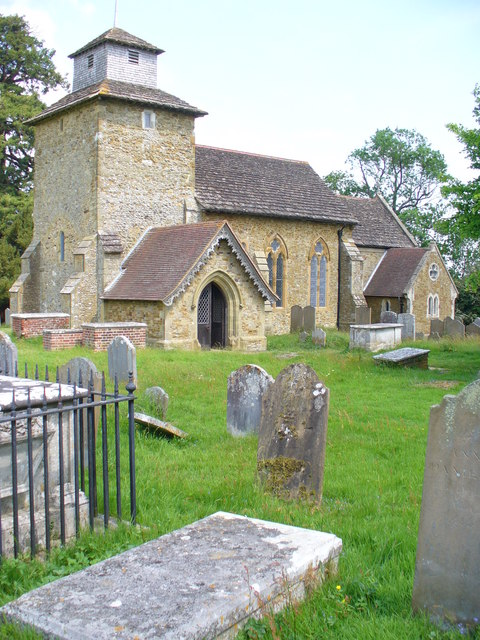
St John's Church, Wotton

The parish church of St John the Evangelist is situated in the scattered hamlet of Wotton at the end of Church Lane overlooking a broad sweep of the North Downs.

The founding of the church dates back to Saxon times, although only a few of the original footings now remain to the west of the Norman tower.

The parish itself is shaped like a long finger stretching from the foot of the North Downs to Friday Street.

Much of the church was, of necessity, restored in Victorian times, but there are still many interesting original features.

John Evelyn, diarist, and Mary Evelyn are buried in the Evelyn Chapel in the church.

== Demography, economy and housing ==
At the census of 2011 there were 583 people forming 244 households in the parish. 456 persons were aged 16–74 of which 59 worked in extractive or manufacturing industries and 55 ran a business. There was significant gravel quarrying in the region. 94 people walked/cycled to work or worked at home and 34 used public transport to travel to work.

The Wotton House hotel constitutes the largest employer. Many of the farms are arable, owing to the rich soil. To the north and south, on the North Downs and Leith Hill, the land is owned by the National Trust.

2011 Census Homes
Output area	Detached	Semi-detached	Terraced	Flats and apartments	Caravans/temporary/mobile homes	shared between households
(Civil Parish)	136	71	27	10	1	0

The average level of accommodation in the region composed of detached houses was 28%, the average that was apartments was 22.6%.

2011 Census Key Statistics
Output area	Population	Households	% Owned outright	% Owned with a loan	hectares
(Civil Parish)	583	245	30.2%	18.8%	2,243

The proportion of households in the civil parish who owned their home outright compares to the regional average of 35.1%. The proportion who owned their home with a loan compares to the regional average of 32.5%. The remaining % is made up of rented dwellings (plus a negligible % of households living rent-free).

== Notable people ==
- John Evelyn, diarist, born at Wotton House 1620, and buried (with his wife) in the Evelyn Chapel in St John's Church, Wotton.
- Thomas Malthus clergyman and political economist, was curate at Oakwood Chapel in the parish of Wotton, 1789–1834.
- Vernon White, the noted theologian, was rector from 1987–1993.
- Ralph Vaughan Williams, composer, grew up at Leith Hill Place, and owned it briefly in 1944, when he gave it to the National Trust.

== See also ==
- Friday Street
