= Wotton House, Surrey =

Country house in Wotton, Surrey, England

Wotton House
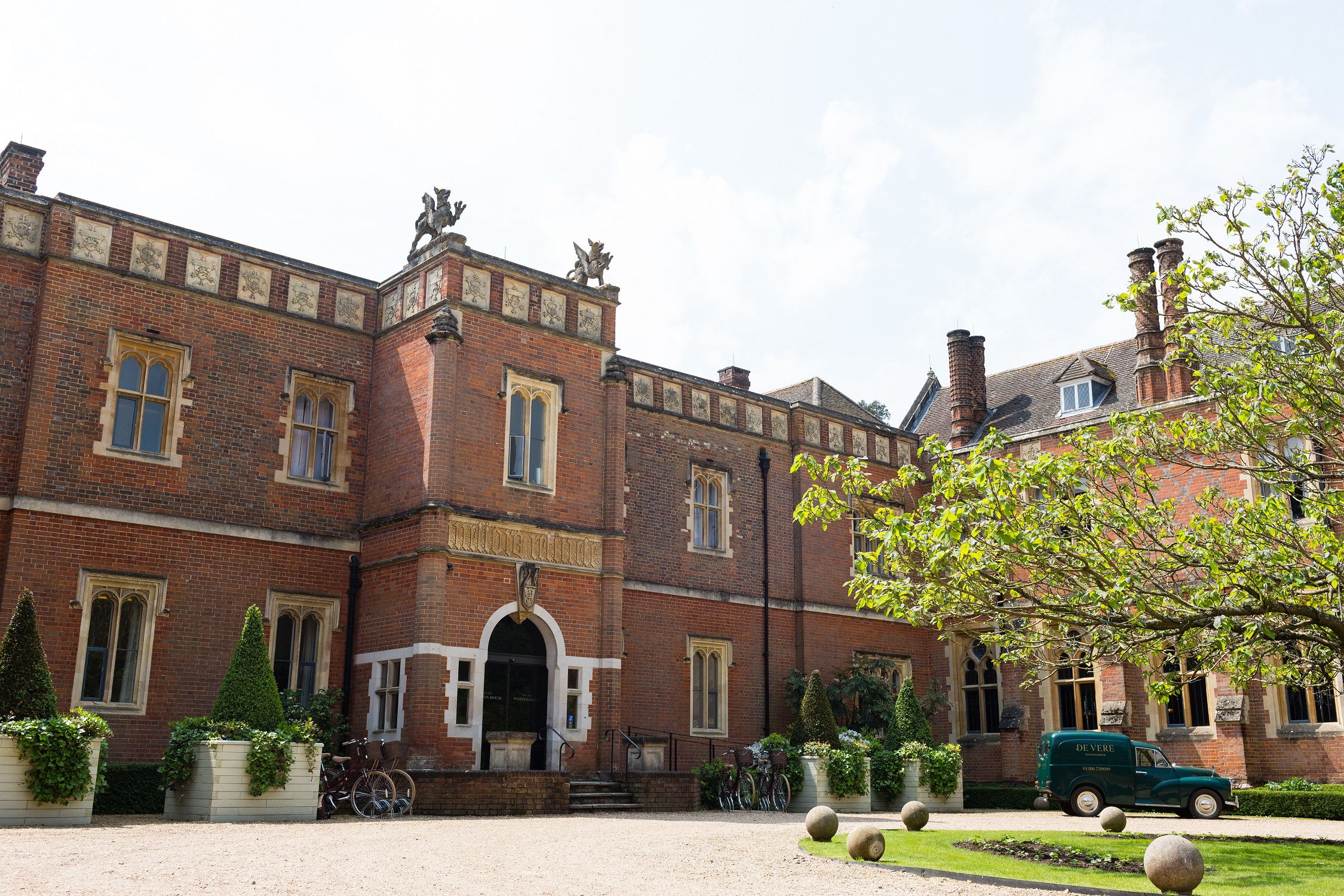
- Wotton House north side main entrance

- Location within Surrey
- 51°12′39″N 0°23′44″W
- Type: Country house
- Location: Guildford Road, Wotton, Surrey

History
- Built: 17th century

Site notes
- Area: 20 ha (49 acres)
- Owner: InterContinental Hotels Group

Listed Building – Grade II*
- Official name: Wotton House
- Designated: 11 March 1987
- Reference no.: 1189814

National Register of Historic Parks and Gardens
- Official name: Wotton House
- Designated: 1 June 1984
- Reference no.: 1000391

Listed Building – Grade II
- Official name: Waterwork grotto to south west of Wotton House
- Designated: 11 March 1987
- Reference no.: 1378104

Listed Building – Grade II
- Official name: Grotto to east of Wotton House
- Designated: 11 March 1987
- Reference no.: 1294093

Wotton House is a hotel, wedding venue, conference centre and former country house in Wotton near Dorking, Surrey, England. Originally the centre of the Wotton Estate and the seat of the Evelyn family, it was the birthplace in 1620 of diarist and landscape gardener John Evelyn, who built the first Italian garden in England there.

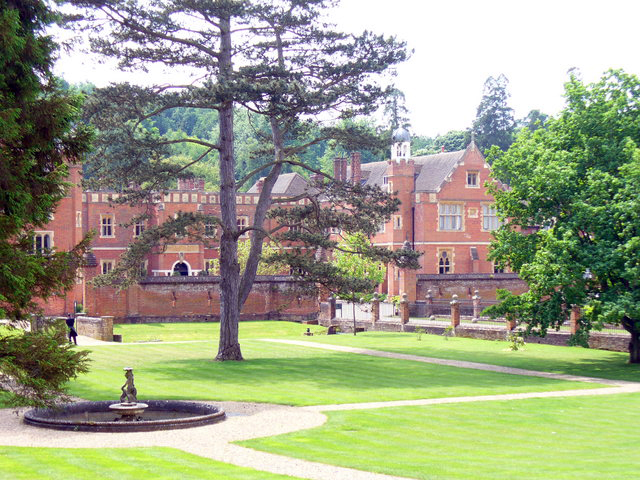
Wotton House North Side

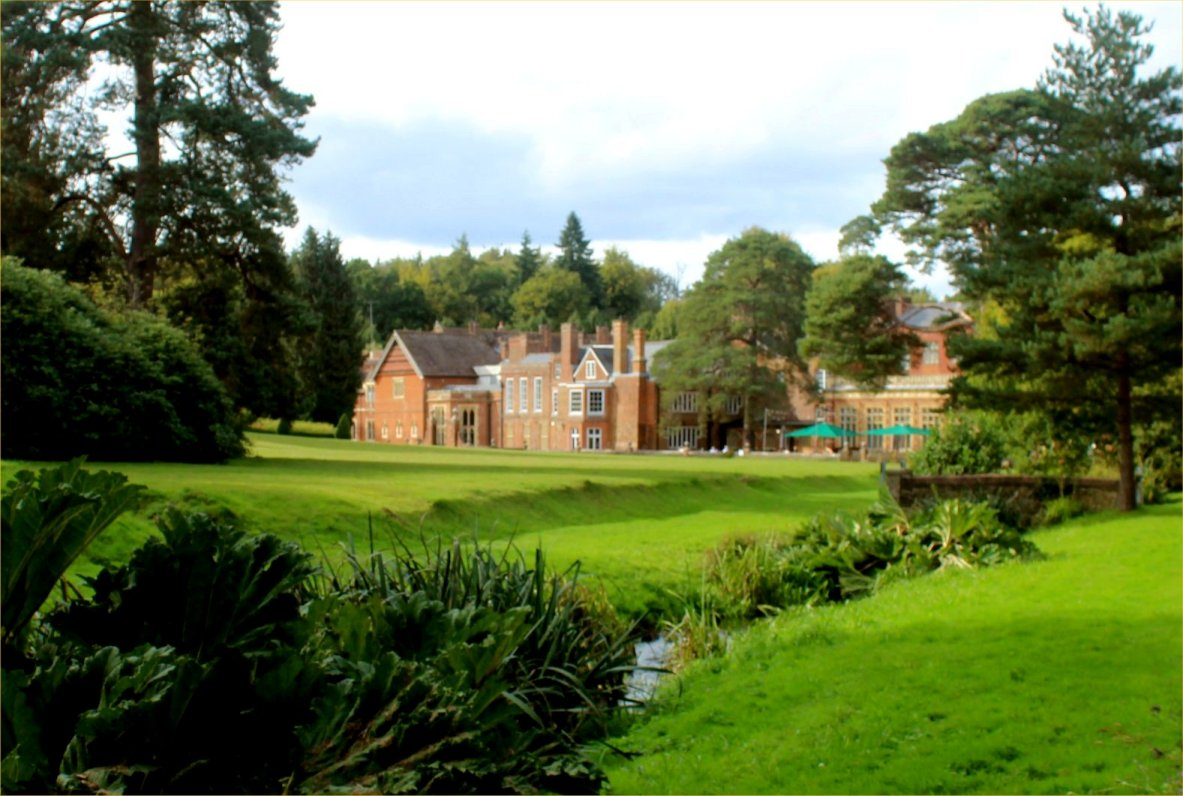
Wotton house from the SE

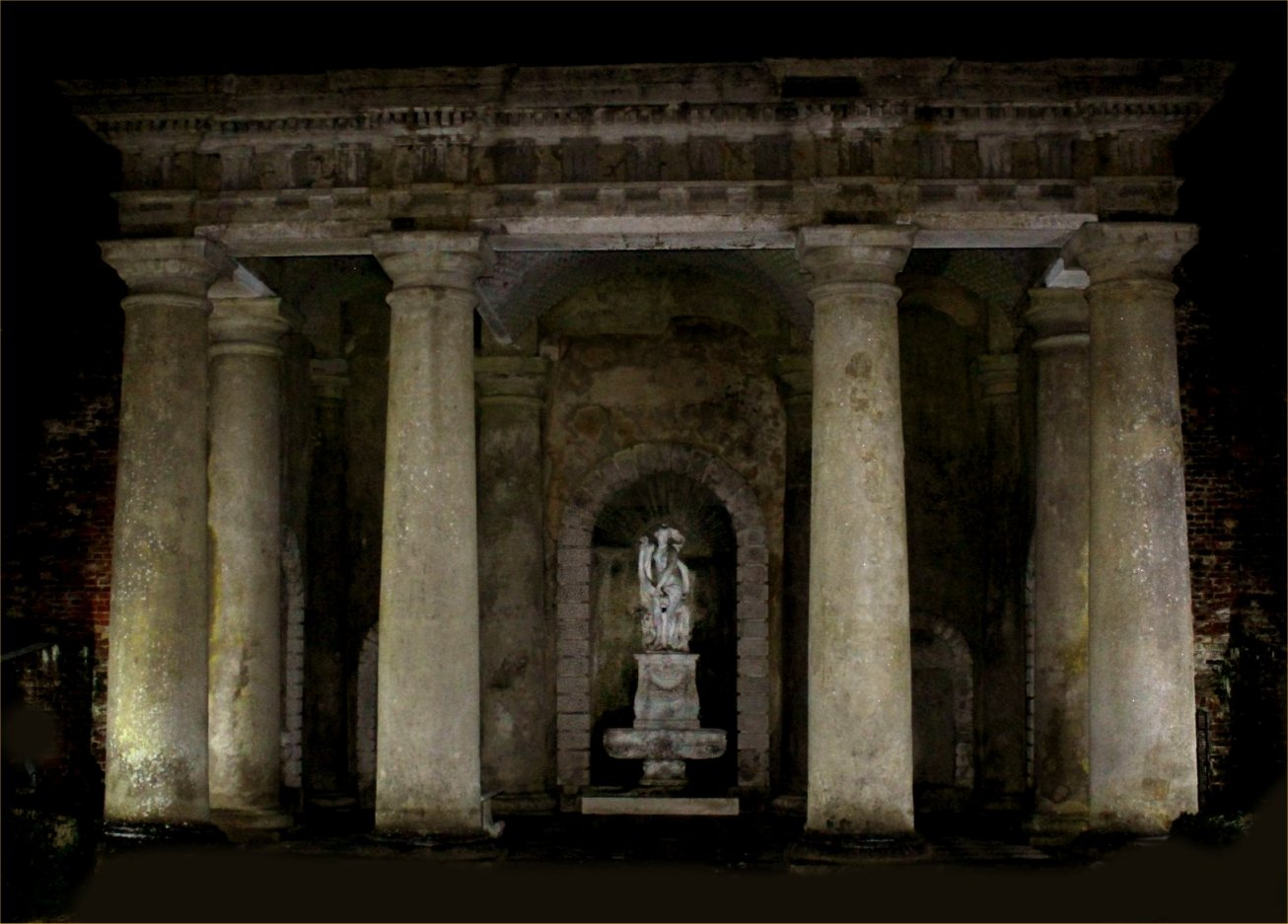
Temple in Wotton House garden south of the main building

The garden on the south side is of several acres, and can be walked, including up steps to near the top of the hill.

== Construction ==
George Evelyn bought Wotton from Henry Owen, a descendant of Owen Tudor, in 1579. The house was built in the early 17th century by the Evelyn family who extended it in the later 17th century. In the 18th century it was extended eastwards by William Kent. Further extensions and alterations were made in the early 19th century by Francis Edwards. Following a fire in the 1870s the house was restored and enlarged by Henry Woodyer for William John Evelyn in 1877.

Its architectural features include distinctive terracotta decorations on brickwork, octagonal turrets and stacks, winged gryphons on the porch, and plaster wall panels by Kent painted in Chinese style by Belgian Jean Derraux. The old orangery (now the centre's bar), has a decorative parapet and banded piers. Many of the doors feature small paintings above them.

The garden to the south between the house and the hill is about 10 acres and contains a number of interesting features. One is a temple inserted into the hill with marble pillars and the statue of a lady

== The estate ==
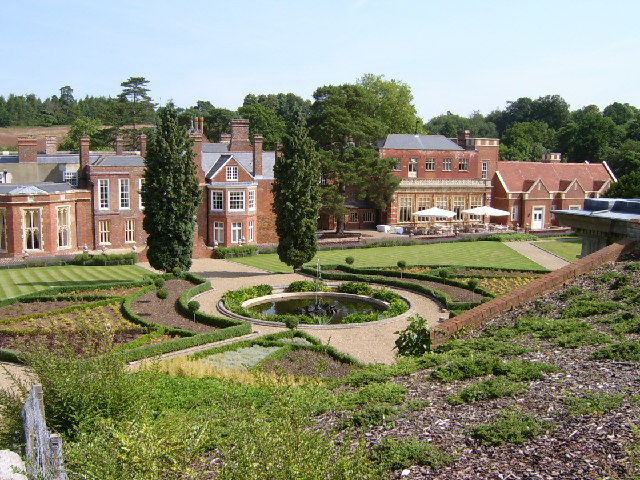
Wotton House, South side showing terraced gardens, 2003

John Evelyn (1620–1706) and his elder brother George created the first Italian garden in England. Work on it started in 1643, was completed by 1652, and it is the house's most famous feature. The grounds are unusually highly listed as Grade II* and there are also two grottoes close to the house, both listed Grade II.

The River Tillingbourne flows through the estate, which had its own mill at one time. The mill was originally used for the manufacture of gunpowder, a major source of the family's fortune. Later the mill was adapted for use as a wire-works and copper mill.

== Notable residents ==
Wotton House was the family seat of the Evelyn Family. John Evelyn, the diarist, landscape designer and collector, was born in a room still in existence there. He inherited the house and estates on the death of his brother George in 1699.

The descendants who inherited the house in turn included Conservative politician William John Evelyn (1822-1908), who was elected MP for Western Surrey from 1849 until 1857 and became MP for Deptford in 1885 until resigning in 1888.

== Post-war use ==
Between 1947 and 1981 the house was leased to the Home Office and used as the Fire Service College.

Grade II* listed status was given to the garden in 1984, and the house and its two garden grottoes became listed in 1987.

== Twenty-first century ==
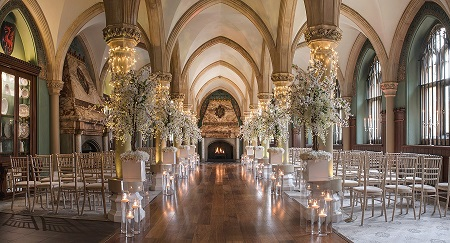
Wotton House being used as a wedding venue

In 2003, having been fully refurbished following a period of relative neglect, Wotton House was re-opened as a hotel, wedding venue, training and conference centre.

The property is currently owned and run by InterContinental Hotels Group. It has several conference suites, an indoor swimming pool and athletic centre. A large church-style structure on the north side can be used for ceremonial events such as weddings.
