= Albury, Surrey =

Village and civil parish in Surrey, England

Coordinates: 51°13′09″N 0°30′05″W

Albury
- Village and civil parish
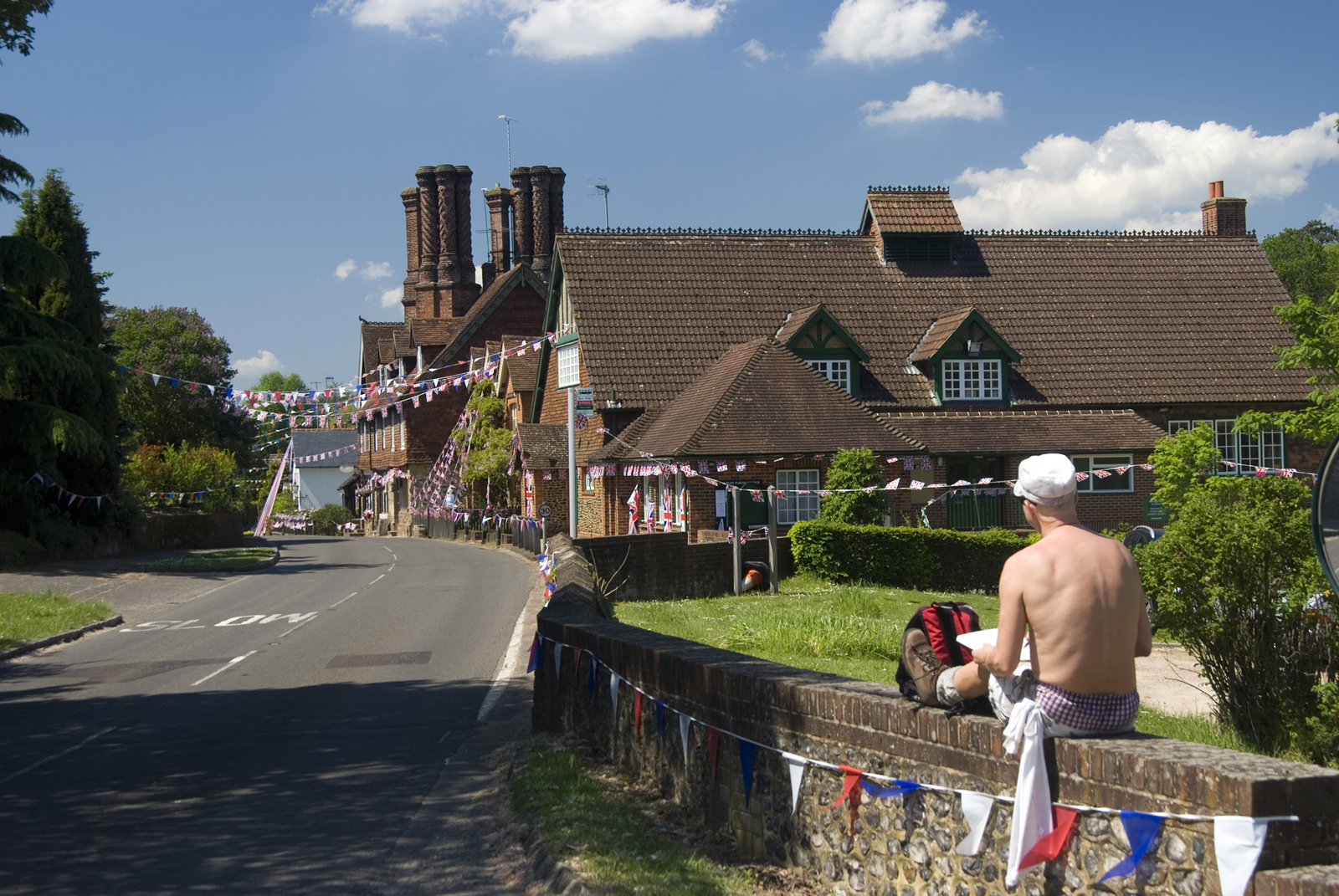
- Albury village

- Location within Surrey
- Area: 16.28 km^{2} (6.29 sq mi)
- Population: 1,191 (civil parish 2011)
  - Density: 73/km^{2} (190/sq mi)
- OS grid reference: TQ0447
- Shire county: Surrey
- Region: South East
- Country: England
- Sovereign state: United Kingdom
- Post town: Guildford
- Postcode district: GU5
- Dialling code: 01483
- Police: Surrey
- Fire: Surrey
- Ambulance: South East Coast
- UK Parliament: Godalming and Ash

Albury is a village and civil parish in central Surrey, England, around 3.5 miles (5.6 km) east of Guildford. It is in the Surrey Hills National Landscape and the Borough of Guildford.

The civil parish covers an area of 1,628 ha (6.3 sq mi) and includes the settlements of Albury Heath, Farley Green, Little London and Brook. The area is drained by the River Tillingbourne and its tributaries, the Law Brook and the Sherbourne Brook.

== Geography and economy ==
Albury civil parish spans the small village and three hamlets, which are Farley Green, Little London and adjacent Brook – spaced out by Albury Heath, Foxholes Wood, small fields and Albury Park. About a third of Blackheath Common on the Greensand Ridge is in the parish, which centrally nestles in the Vale of Holmesdale. The old village lay within what is now Albury Park. Albury new village is at the point where the Sherborne, flowing from near Newlands Corner via the Silent Pool, joins the Tillingbourne that runs through the centre of the village and until the 20th century powered Albury flour mill at the Chilworth edge of the village. The mill is now converted into offices and apartments. There is another watercourse leading into the Tillingbourne at Chilworth, the Law Brook, which the hamlet of Brook is centred on.

The 66-acre (27 ha) Colyers Hanger SSSI, an area of ancient woodland, is in the parish of Albury.

According to the 2011 Census, the population was 1,191. This was an increase of one since 2001 when the population lived in 527 homes (52 of which had their lowest floor level above street level and 298 of which were owner-occupied). While 583 people were economically active: 372 commuted by motor vehicle and 61 commuted by public transport, the average Albury commuter travelled 17 kilometres (11 mi).

The village has a post office and general shop, and the "Drummond at Albury" inn; Little London has another public house the, "William IV", which dates back to the 16th century.

The nearest railway stations are just beyond the borders: Chilworth, 1 mile (1.6 km) west, and Gomshall, 2 miles (3.2 km) east, of the parish boundaries, both on the North Downs Line.

== History ==
The earliest written record of the village is from Domesday Book of 1086, in which it appears as Eldeberie. It is thought to be the settlement named Ældeburi and Ealdeburi in 13th-century copies of Anglo-Saxon documents from 933 and 1062 respectively, although this identification is not certain. In the 13th century, it is recorded as Aldebir (1242), Aldebiri (1253) and Audeburi (1284); the modern spelling "Albury" first appears in 1487. The name is generally agreed to derive from the Old English words ald (old) and burh (fortification), which may refer to the Romano-British camp at Farley Heath in the south of the civil parish.

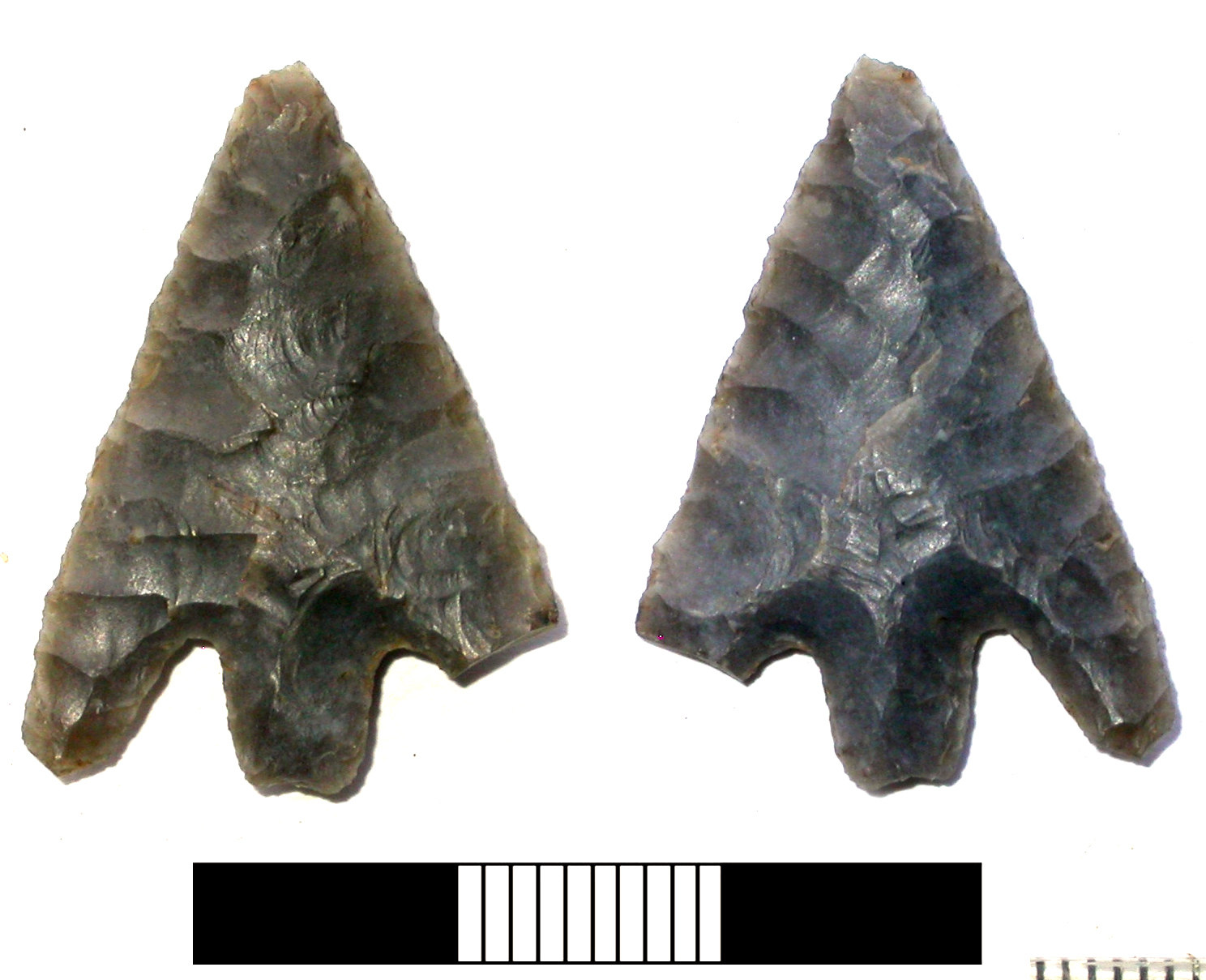
A Bronze Age flint arrowhead, found in the northwest of the civil parish in 1990 and dated to c. 2000 – c. 1500 BCE

The earliest evidence of human activity in the parish is from the Mesolithic. Stone age artefacts found in the area include a flint blade, an axe and a scraper. A small late Bronze Age settlement was excavated in the north of the parish in the 1960s.

Farley Heath, in the southwest of the parish, has remains of a Romano-Celtic temple within a temenos in a clearing by Heath Road containing an inner cella, nearby a pottery kiln and tumbled columns can be seen.

The entry for Albury in Domesday Book indicates that the manor was held by Roger d'Abernon from Richard de Tonebrige. Its assets were: 2½ hides, 1 church, 1 mill worth 5s, 8½ ploughs, 1-acre (4,000 m^{2}) of meadow, woodland worth 30 hogs. It rendered £9.

The medieval village of Albury was clustered around the old church of St Peter and St Paul, which has Saxon origins. In 1842, Henry Drummond moved the rest of the village half a mile westward to what was originally the hamlet of Weston Street, where he also built a new church. The Duke of Northumberland owns the estate – the Mansion was once home to the Duke and Duchess. The gardens are designated Grade I and were designed by author and gardener John Evelyn whose family home was nearby at Wotton, 6 miles (9.7 km) to the east.

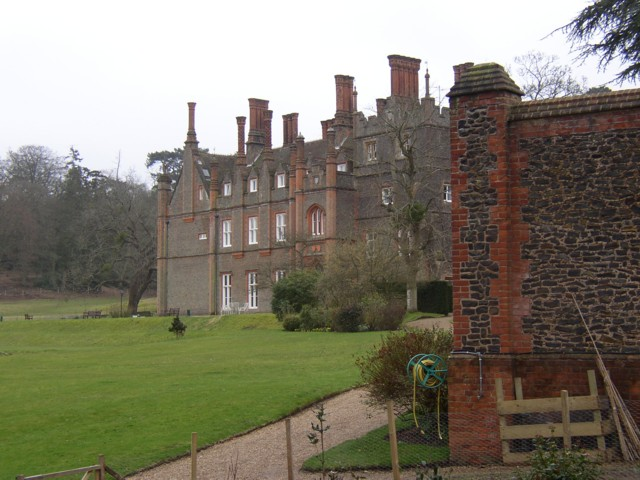
Albury Park mansion

Albury village is next to Albury Estate which is an estate of 150 acres (0.61 km^{2}). Within it is the Saxon church, the Mansion or Albury Park House, a Grade II* listed building.

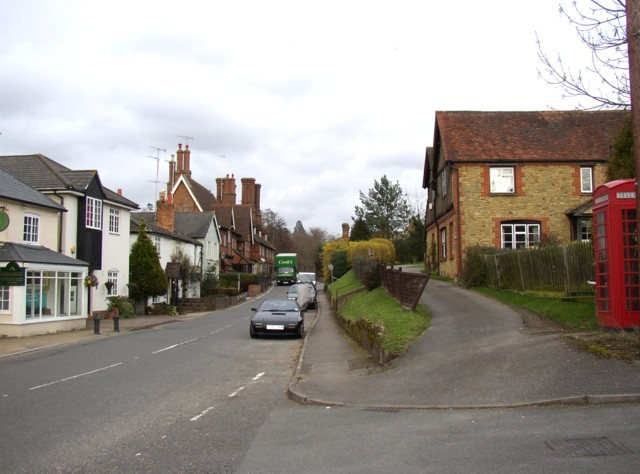
The main street through Albury

== Sports ==
Fishing is available in the stocked Albury Estate ponds at Weston, Vale End, Albury Park and at Powder Mills, Chilworth with the Albury Estate Fisheries club.

Albury Cricket Club play at the Albury Heath ground that adjoins Albury Eagles FC, close to Albury and to Little London in Sandy Lane, the clubs have a combined social events calendar. The football club has several U16, U13 and U9 teams.

== Churches ==
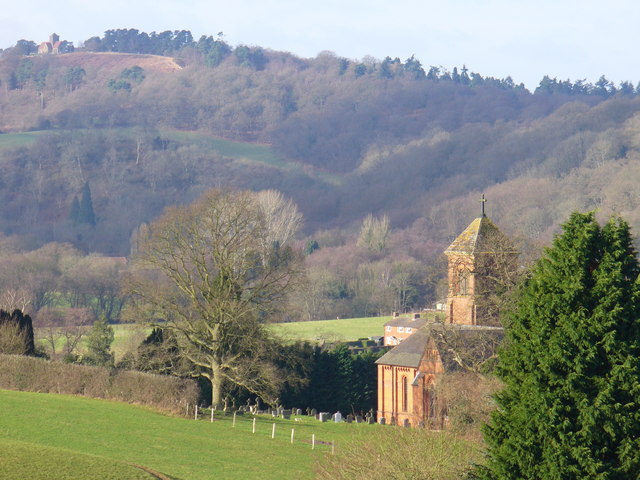
The parish church, field, woods and St Martha's Hill

The parish of Albury has four churches:

- The parish church of St Peter and St Paul, built 1842 by McIntosh Brooks in red brick as a copy of the 12th-century Église Saint-Pierre [fr], Thaon, Normandy. The transept and apse were added in 1868 by Sir Arthur Blomfield, and the north chapel created as a Second World War memorial by neo-gothicist Sir Edward Maufe, designer of Guildford Cathedral.
- The Barn church, St Michael's in Farley Green.
- Old St Peter and St Paul's Church, a church of Saxon origin with 12th-century tower, 13th-century chancel, 14th-century nave and 16th-century north porch, Drummond Chapel (with marble chest tomb) and south window with quatrefoil renewed by Pugin: in Albury Park in the care of the Churches Conservation Trust, a Grade I listed building.
- The Catholic Apostolic Church graded II*, also built by McIntosh Brooks, is by the Sherbourne brook at the northeast end of the village street near to where it joins the A25. Built in 1839, it was used by a specific sect that expected the second coming of Christ. When the last of the members died in 1901 the church was sealed until Christ returns with the grounds kept in perfect condition.

== Demography and housing ==
2011 Census Homes
Output area	Detached	Semi -detached	Terraced	Flats and apartments	Caravans mobile homes	Shared housing
(Civil Parish)	235	134	56	51	3	0

The average level of accommodation in the region composed of detached houses was 28%, the average which were apartments was 22.6%.

2011 Census Key Statistics
Output area	Population	Households	Owned outright	Owned with a loan	hectares
(Civil Parish)	1,191	479	34.2%	27.1%	1,628

The proportion of households in the civil parish who owned their home outright compares to the regional average of 35.1%. The proportion who owned their home with a loan compares to the regional average of 32.5%. The remaining % is made up of rented dwellings (plus a negligible % of households living rent-free).

== Albury landfill ==
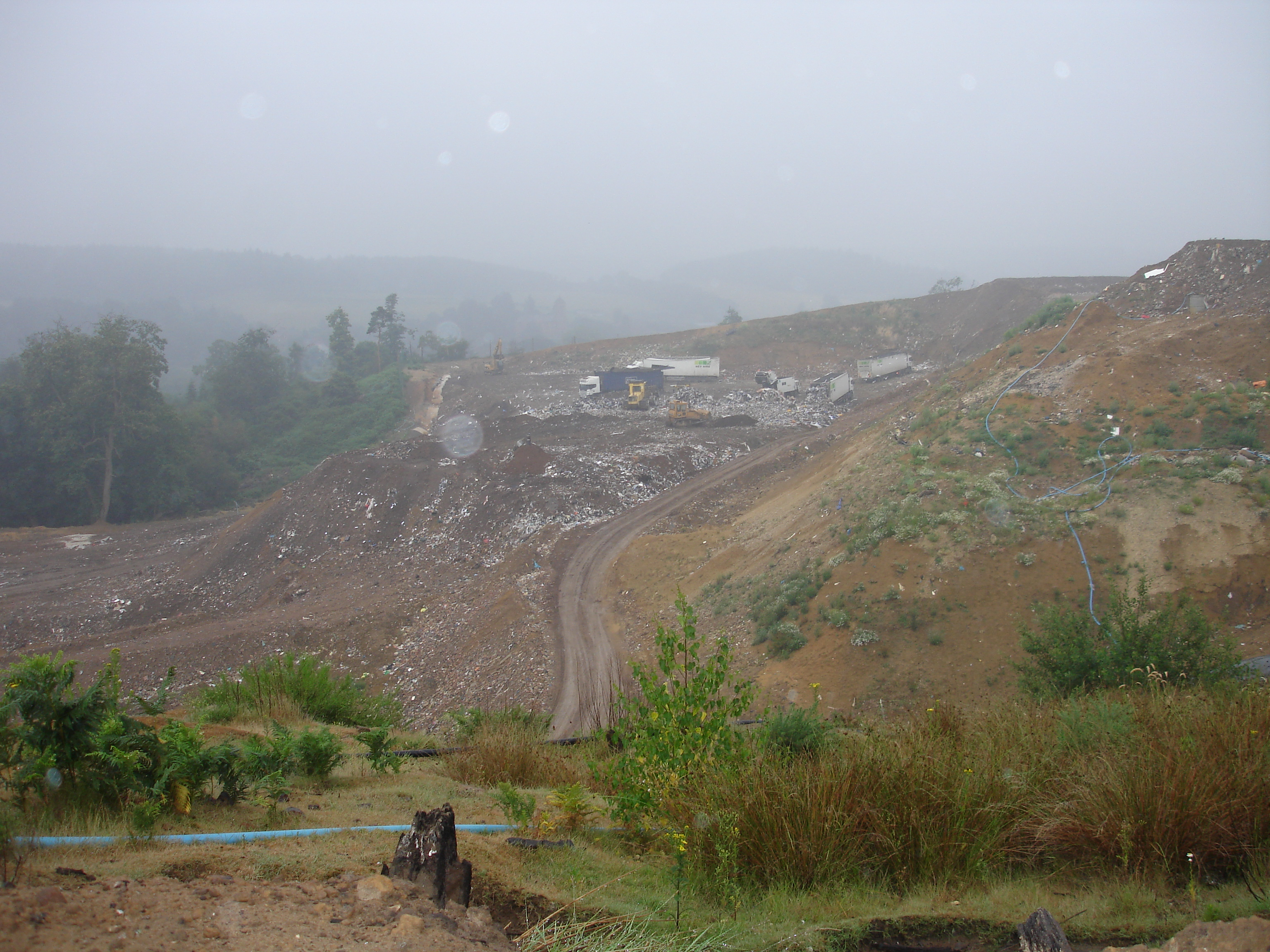
Albury landfill

Albury landfill site was granted a waste disposal licence in November 1989. The 56-acre (23 ha) site, a former sand quarry to the north of the village, was adapted to hold household waste in storage cells lined with a waterproof membrane to prevent groundwater contamination. In 2013, the operators were fined for allowing leachate to escape from the site over a four year period. Since 2008, biogas produced by the decaying waste has been collected for use as a vehicle fuel.
