= Law Brook, Surrey =

Stream in Surrey, England

Law Brook Postford Brook
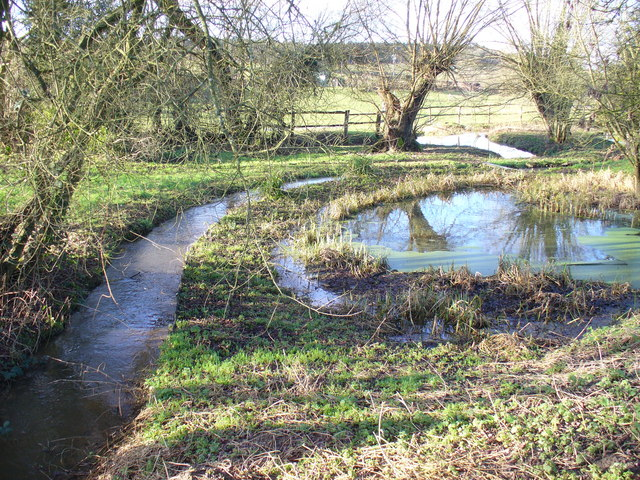
- Law Brook flowing westwards from the hamlet of Brook towards Postford

Location
- Country: England
- County: Surrey
- Borough: Guildford Borough

Physical characteristics
- Source: Gasson Farm, The Hurtwood and sources in Peaslake proper
  - location: Peaslake, Shere, Borough of Guildford
  - coordinates: 51°11′02″N 0°26′38″W
  - elevation: 148 m (486 ft)
- Mouth: River Tillingbourne
  - location: Colyers Hanger, Albury (foot), Borough of Guildford
  - coordinates: 51°13′20″N 0°31′00″W
  - elevation: 50 m (160 ft)
- Length: 7 km (4.3 mi)
- Discharge
  - location: Albury
  - average: 0.11 m^{3}/s (3.9 cu ft/s)
  - minimum: 0.05 m^{3}/s (1.8 cu ft/s)(4 August 1992)
  - maximum: 0.8 m^{3}/s (28 cu ft/s)(15 September 1968)

Basin features
- Progression: Postford/Law Brook—Tillingbourne—River Wey—River Thames
- River system: Thames Basin

The Law Brook or Postford Brook is a stream in the Surrey Hills AONB which feeds the Tillingbourne which in turn feeds the River Wey. It is notable in its own right chiefly for its industrial vestiges and records.

== Course ==
The stream runs, WNW then north, about 7 km (4.3 mi) in the Vale of Holmesdale (a mainly geological term explaining the axis of the basins of the Medway, Mole, Tillingbourne and Wey, west branch). It mainly rises in the former manor farms and common land of Peaslake on the northern slopes of the Greensand Ridge. It drains much of the northern Winterfold Forest/Hurtwood: the upper half of the drainage basin is forest with some pasture save for the large hamlet itself. The stream waters the clustered village of Brook/Little London in Albury. On the left bank the stream has, after its coalescence of headwaters, the northern lands of Farley Green (the secondary village in Albury parish) then briefly a low corner of Blackheath, Wonersh – a sparsely inhabited wooded plateau, on the opposite bank of the closest-to-village fields of Albury's main settlement, including a further former millhouse.

The last 500 m (550 yd) demarcates the land (parish) of Albury from St Martha, centred on Chilworth. It and the Tillingbourne were harnessed by digging leats (narrow cuts) and mill ponds for industrial mills – the Royal Gunpowder Mills, a long leat dividing Chilworth and supplying its largest pond, known today as The Fish Pond.

The North Downs Line follows a distant right bank of the Brook for 1.8 km (1.1 mi) along the width of Albury's essentially rectangular parish.
