= River Tillingbourne =

River in Surrey, England

Coordinates: 51°13′02″N 0°32′59″W

Tillingbourne
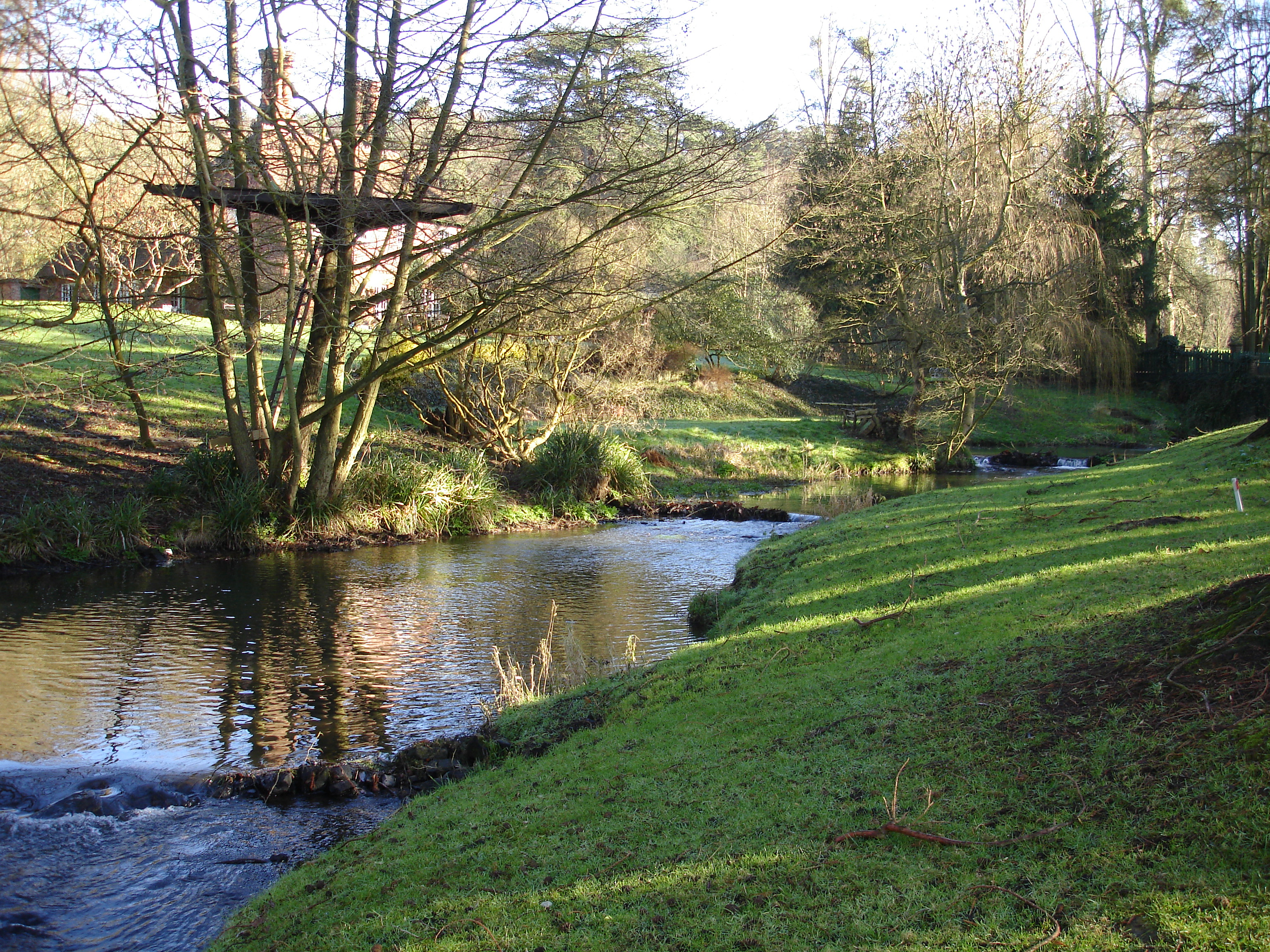
- River Tillingbourne running through the Albury estate

Location
- Country: England
- County: Surrey
- Districts: Mole Valley District, Guildford Borough

Physical characteristics
- Source: Tilling Springs
  - location: Leith Hill, Surrey
- Length: 24 km (15 mi)
- Discharge
  - location: Shalford
  - average: 0.54 m^{3}/s (19 cu ft/s)
  - minimum: 0.23 m^{3}/s (8.1 cu ft/s)(4 August 1992)
  - maximum: 6.1 m^{3}/s (220 cu ft/s)(15 September 1968)

Basin features
- Tributaries
  - left: Friday Street Stream; Holmbury St Mary Stream; Law Brook
  - right: Sherbourne Brook

The River Tillingbourne (also known as the Tilling Bourne) runs along the south side of the North Downs and joins the River Wey at Shalford. Its source is a mile south of Tilling Springs to the north of Leith Hill at grid reference TQ143437 and it runs through Friday Street, Abinger Hammer, Gomshall, Shere, Albury, Chilworth and Shalford. The source is a semi-natural uninhabited area. The catchment is situated on sandstone which has a low rate of weathering. The Tillingbourne is 24 km (15 mi) in length.

== Geography ==
The Tillingbourne initially flows northward for 4 km (2.5 mi) down the northern slopes of Leith Hill over a series of weirs and cascades, before turning west to run for 14 km (8.7 mi) through Abinger Hammer and Chilworth towards the River Wey at Shalford. The river is classified as a subsequent stream, since its course is determined by the direction of the stratum of softer rock for the majority of its length.

The river has four principal tributaries: the Friday Street stream joins at Wotton House; the Holmbury St Mary stream joins at Abinger Hammer; the Sherbourne Brook drains the Silent Pool and Sherbourne Pond and the Law Brook joins near Postford.

== Industry ==
From the 17th to the mid 20th centuries the Tillingbourne valley was a major industrial area due to its closeness to London and the ease of transport via the Wey and the Thames. The river was used to power a relatively large number of mills in the area. Some 24 mill sites have been identified along the course of the river, used for such diverse industries as gunpowder, paper making for bank-notes, iron-working, wire-making, fulling, tanning and pumping water, as well as the more conventional flour, grist and malt milling. Some of the earliest gunpowder mills were those set up in 1626 by The East India Company at Chilworth.

John Evelyn wrote in his diary in 1676:

I do not remember to have seen such Variety of Mills and Works upon so narrow a Brook, and in so little a Compass, there being Mills for Corn, Cloth, Brass, Iron, Powder etc.

Not every one was so impressed, William Cobbett wrote:

This valley, which seems to have been created by bountiful providence, as one of the choicest retreats of man, which seems formed for a scene of innocence and happiness, has been, by ungrateful man, so perverted as to make it instrumental in effecting two of the most damnable of purposes; in carrying into execution two of the most damnable inventions that ever sprang from the minds of man under the influence of the devil! Namely, the making of gunpowder and of banknotes!

Present day users include a trout farm, watercress beds, a business growing reeds and a gin distillery.

The river passes through the Albury estate which operates recreational fisheries at Weston fishery, Vale End fishery and Powder Mills fishery. The river's natural course has been diverted slightly here for the purposes of the estate.

The Shalford pumping station, close to the junction with the Wey, provides between 4 and 7 million gallons of water per day to supply Godalming and parts of Guildford.

=== Mills ===
- Brookmill
- Friday Street Upper Mill (Friday Street Stream tributary)
- Friday Street Mill (Friday Street Stream tributary)
- Wotton House Mill
- Crane's Mill, Abinger
- Paddington Mill, now converted to private housing
- Abinger Hammer Mill
- Sutton Mill (Holbury St Mary Stream tributary)
- Gomshall Mill, now a pub
- Gomshall Tannery
- Netley Mill, also known as Shere Mill
- Shere Lower Mill
- Shere West Mill
- Albury Park Mill
- Albury Mill
- Postford Upper Mill
- Postford Lower Mill, renamed Albury Mill in the 20th century. Also known as Bottings Mill.
- Postford House Mill
- Chilworth Gunpowder Mills, divided between the Lower, Middle and Upper Works.
- Chilworth Great Mill
- Chilworth Little Mill
- East Shalford Mill
- Shalford Mill, now owned by the National Trust

== Environment ==
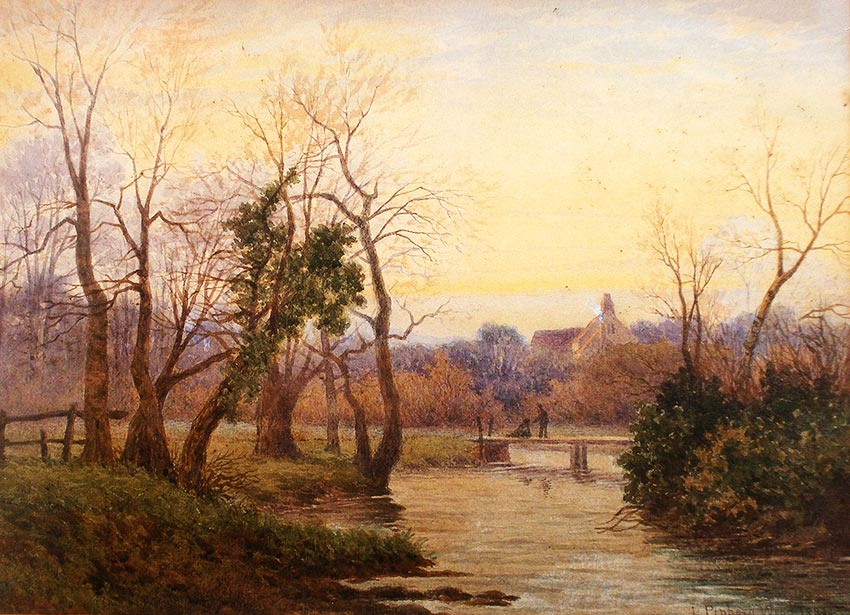
Evening on the Tillingbourne (1889) by Lewis Pinhorn Wood

The River Tillingbourne supports a fish population of both wild brown trout and coarse fish. The Environment Agency has been working with local fishermen to improve the habitat for these fish by recreating a pool and riffle habitat and by cutting back overhanging vegetation. The signal crayfish is a recent invasive species. The river and its environs are often studied by students from nearby field studies centres, such as Sayers Croft and Juniper Hall. There are on-going problems with invasive plants caused by phosphate enrichment due to waste-water treatment from sewage works in addition to agricultural run-off.

The river was championed by the Victorian landscape painter, Lewis Pinhorn Wood, who lived in Shere from 1884 to 1897, and painted extensively along its banks with scenes including The Silent Pool, Twilight (1888) and Evening on the Tillingbourne (1889).

The writer, Ralph Lawrence, recalls hearing the guns on the Western Front while walking in Hurtwood on the southern slopes of the valley .

=== Water quality ===
The Environment Agency measure water quality of the river systems in England. Each is given an overall ecological status, which may be one of five levels: high, good, moderate, poor and bad. There are several components that are used to determine this, including biological status, which looks at the quantity and varieties of invertebrates, angiosperms and fish. Chemical status, which compares the concentrations of various chemicals against known safe concentrations, is rated good or fail.

The water quality of the Tillingbourne was as follows in 2022:

Section	Ecological Status	Chemical Status	Length	Catchment	Channel
Tillingbourne	Moderate	Fail	24.122 km (14.989 mi)	58.931 km^{2} (22.753 sq mi)	

== Other Notable Features ==
- Tillingbourne Waterfall
- Newlands Corner affords panoramic views over the valley.
- Silent Pool
- St Martha's Hill above Chilworth also provides a panorama of the valley.
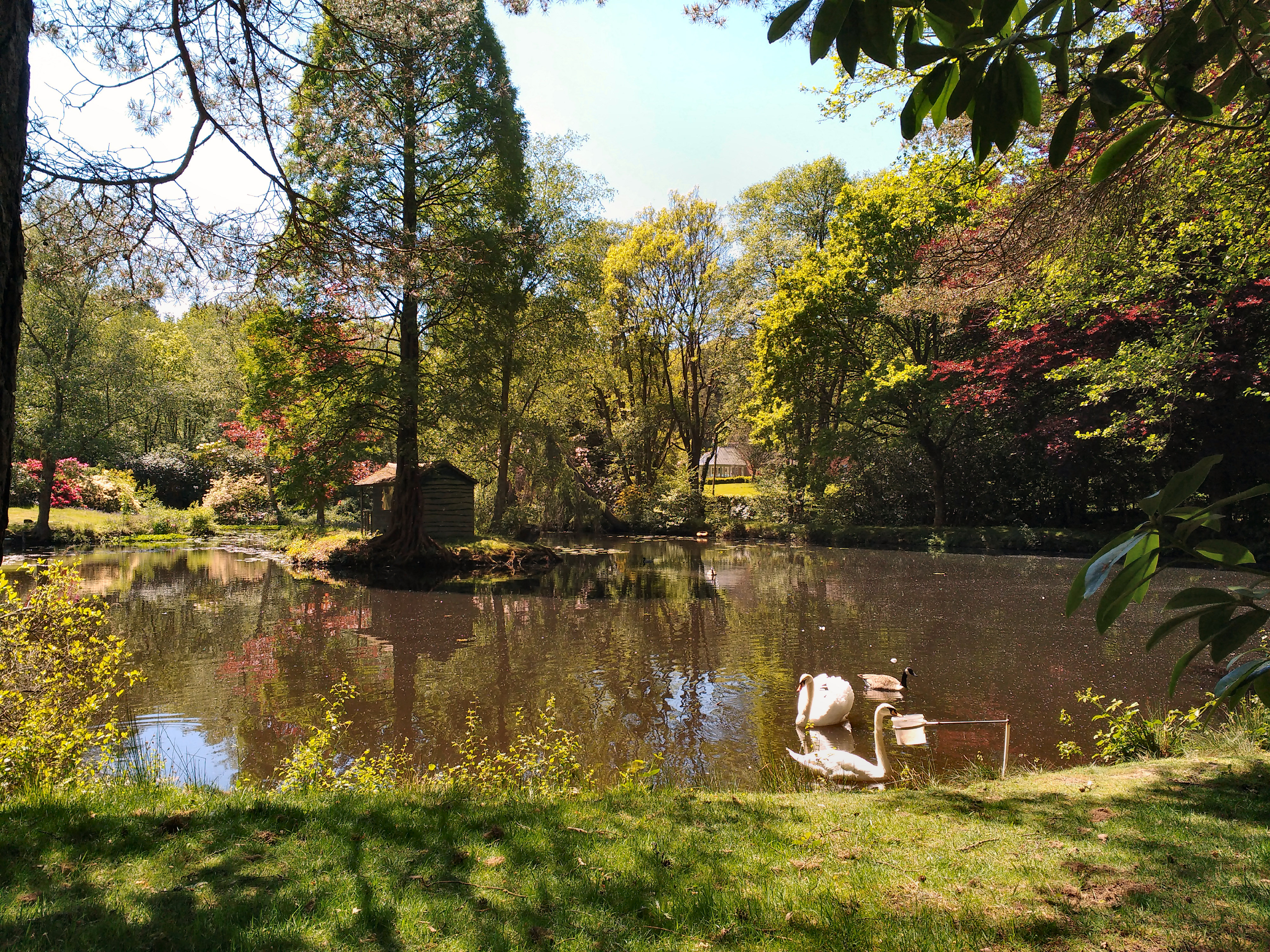
Pond at Tilling Springs

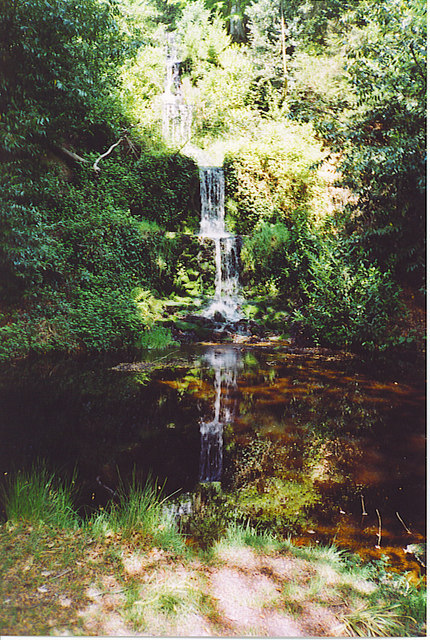
Tilling Waterfall

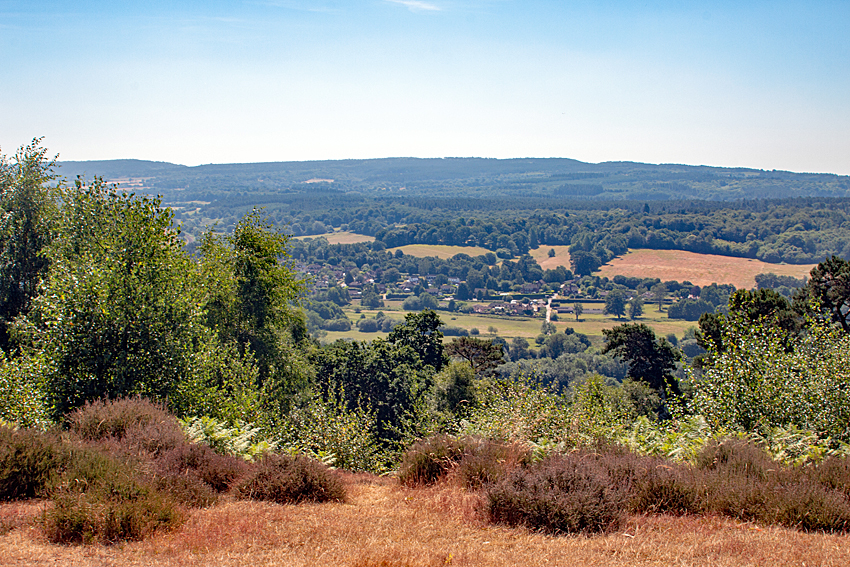
Tillingbourne valley panorama from St Martha's Hill
