= Silent Pool =

Lake in Surrey, England

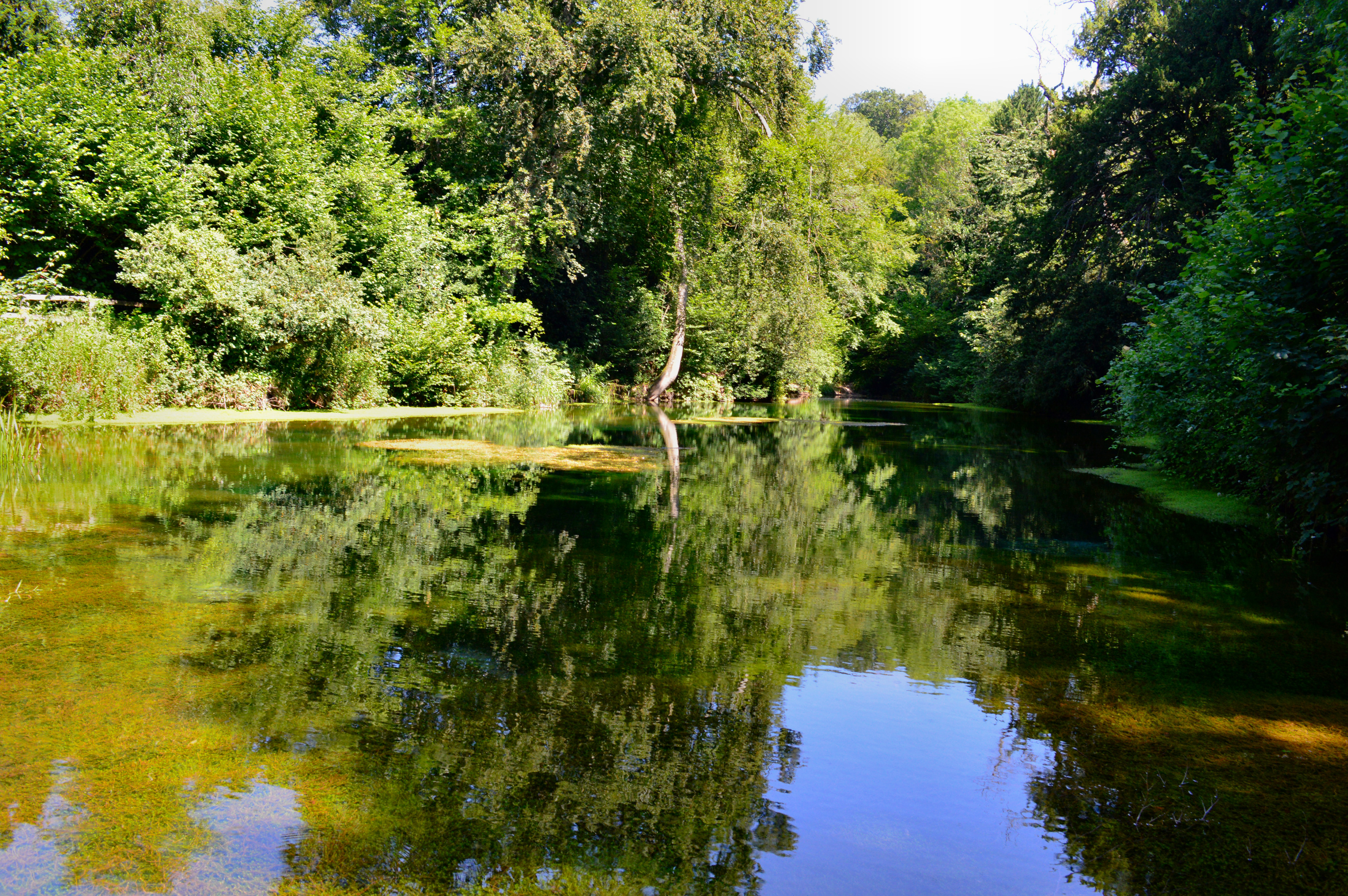
- Silent Pool in Summer

- Location within Surrey
- Location: Surrey
- Coordinates: 51°13′35.5″N 0°28′57.3″W
- Primary inflows: spring
- Primary outflows: Sherbourne Brook

Silent Pool is a spring-fed lake at the foot of the North Downs, about 4 miles (6 km) east of Guildford in Surrey. The outflow from Silent Pool runs into a second, adjacent, lake, Sherbourne Pond, created in the mid-seventeenth century. In turn the outflow from the Sherbourne Pond feeds the Sherbourne Brook, a tributary of the Tilling Bourne.

== Geology ==
The Silent Pool Spring is the only major spring source in the 10.5-mile-long (16.9 km) scarp slope of the North Downs between the Wey and Mole valleys. It discharges between 1 and 10 megalitres (220,000 to 2.2 million gallons) per day into Silent Pool; and the lake water exhibits a blue opalescence characteristic of chalk spring-fed ponds. In prolonged dry periods, Silent Pool has been known to dry up, although the lower Sherbourne Pond has not.

The Silent Pool lies on lower chalk, observable at the northern end of the pond. Sherbourne Pond lies mainly on gault clay, while its northern end and the stream connecting the two ponds lies on upper greensand. Blocks of the upper greensand can be found in the stream bed: a pale grey siltstone which weathers to brown and is harder than the chalk. A survey in 2006 suggested that the southern half of the pool was dug out at the same time as Sherbourne Pond (1662), while the northern half is of natural origin. It appears that this natural half of the pond was made deeper and lined with clay when the southern half (lined with clay and heather) was added.

== History ==
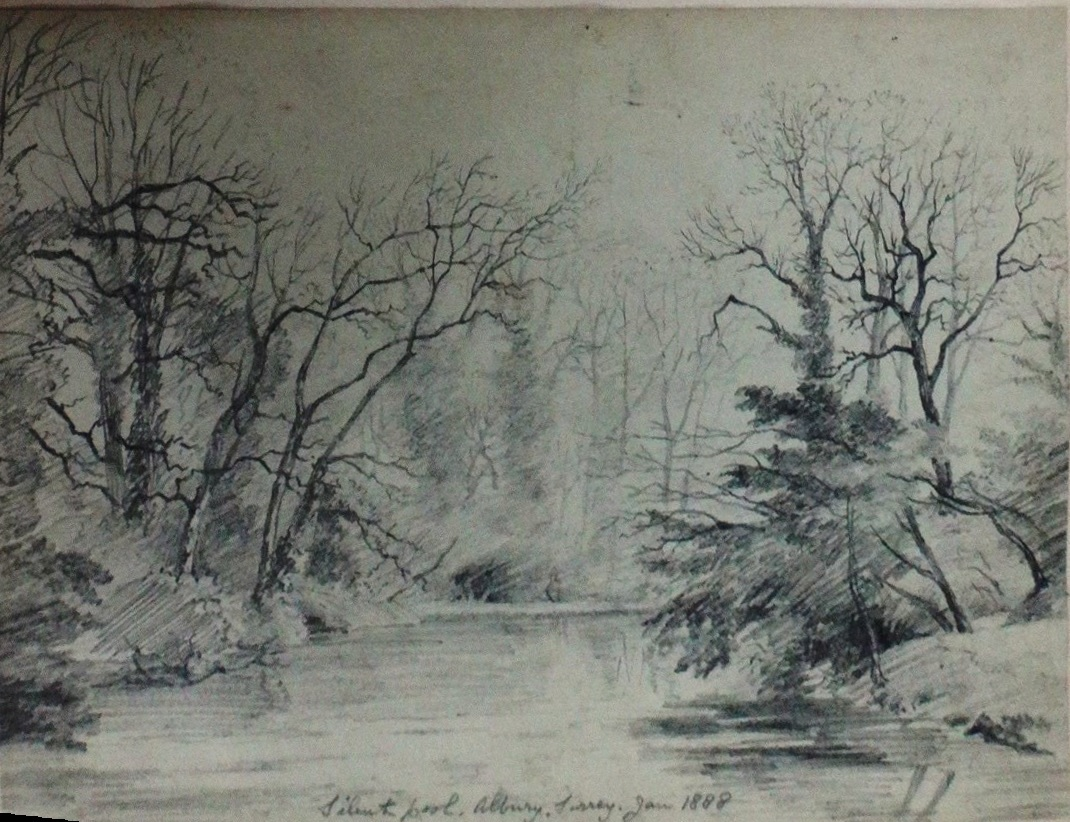
Victorian landscapist Lewis Pinhorn Wood, who lived in Shere village in the 1870s and 1880s, made this sketch of the Silent Pool in 1888, included in his portfolio Sketches from Nature 1869–1908

In 1667, John Evelyn had a leat constructed from the pool to feed a fountain in the grounds of Albury Manor some 800 m (2,600 ft) to the south-west as part of the formal gardens he was laying out for Henry Howard.

The pool has been a popular site for visitors since Victorian times. The lake was admired by the poet Alfred Tennyson. It has a car park, directly on the A25, and a footpath leading to a viewing platform and a walkway which encircles the pool. It can also be reached by walkers on the North Downs Way via a direct path descending the slope.

In recent years Silent Pool came under attack by the invasive weed Crassula helmsii. The weed was thought to have been introduced to the pool by someone tipping the contents of an unwanted aquarium into it. If it had been allowed to grow unchecked, it would have changed the Silent Pool and Sherbourne Pond drastically, “leaving nothing but a green spongy mass, devoid of life”. Work has been undertaken to eradicate the weed and restore the waters at a cost of £49,960.

== Distillery ==
Since 2014, water from the Silent Pool has been used in the production of gin on a site adjacent to Sherbourne pond. A vintage wood-fired steam boiler was restored to power the hand-built copper still, made for Silent Pool Distillers by the Arnold Holstein Company in the Lake Constance area of Germany.

== In popular culture ==
Silent Pool is linked to a 19th-century tale that says King John on his horse abducted a woodcutter's daughter who was forced into the deep water and drowned. According to the legend, the maiden can be seen at midnight. This story appears to have come from a book written by Martin Farquhar Tupper in 1858 called Stephan Langton or The Days Of King John (A Romance of the Silent Pool). The story is based on real historic characters including Stephen Langton, a former archbishop of Canterbury, and King John.

In December 1926, when crime writer Agatha Christie disappeared, it was feared that she had drowned in Silent Pool after her abandoned car was discovered at nearby Newlands Corner.

In 2010, scenes from the Tim Bevan film, Hippie Hippie Shake, about the Oz magazine obscenity trial, starring Cillian Murphy and Sienna Miller were filmed at Silent Pool but the film was never released.
