= Farley Green =

Farley Green may refer to:

- Farley Green, Suffolk
- Farley Green, Surrey
