= St Martha's Hill and Colyer's Hanger =

Nature reserve in Surrey, England

Coordinates: 51.225°N 0.529°W

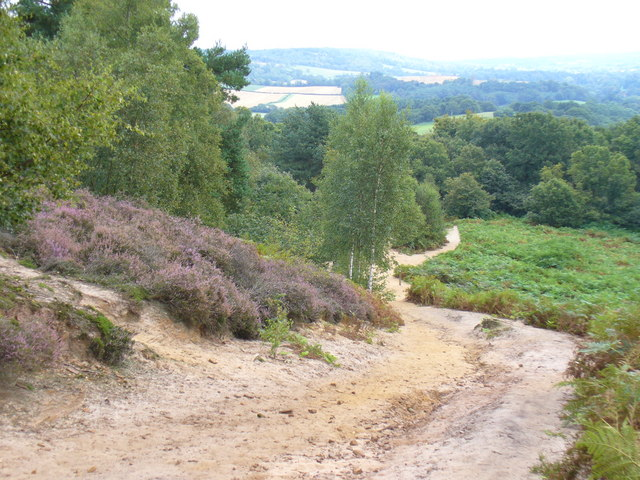
- Interactive map of St Martha's Hill and Colyer's Hanger
- Type: Nature reserve
- Location: Chilworth, Surrey
- OS grid: TQ028483
- Area: 38 hectares (94 acres)

St Martha's Hill and Colyer's Hanger is a 38-hectare (94-acre) nature reserve north of Chilworth in Surrey. It is owned by the Albury Estate and managed by Surrey County Council. Colyers Hanger is a Site of Special Scientific Interest and a Nature Conservation Review site, Grade 2. Earth circles, which are probably associated with tree planting for Chilworth Manor, are a Scheduled Monument.

There is a church on the top of St Martha's Hill, which has views of eight counties on a clear day. The site is woodland and calcareous grassland, which has a rare mixture of chalk grassland flora.

There is access from Guildford Lane and Halfpenny Lane.
