= Lawson Wood =

English painter, illustrator, and joke cartoonist (1878–1957)

- Born: 23 August 1878; Highgate, London, England
- Died: 26 October 1957 (aged 79); Honiton, Devon, England
- Other name: Clarence Lawson Wood
- Occupations: Painter, illustrator and designer
- Spouse: Charlotte Forge (m. 1902)
- Children: 3
- Father: Lewis Pinhorn Wood
- Military career
- Allegiance: United Kingdom
- Branch: Royal Flying Corps
- Conflicts: World War I

Lawson Wood, sometimes Clarence Lawson Wood (Note: Wood disliked the name Clarence and stopped using it in about 1902.) RI FZS, (23 August 1878 – 26 October 1957), was an English painter, illustrator and designer.

== Biography ==
1914 World War I British recruitment poster with art by Wood.

Lawson Wood was born on 23 August 1878 in Highgate, London, the son of landscape artist Pinhorn Wood RI (1848–1918), and the grandson of architectural artist L.J. Wood RI, (1813–1901). He studied at the Slade School of Fine Art, at the Heatherley School of Fine Art, and took evening classes at Frank Calderon's School of Animal Painting.

In 1896, at age 18, he was employed with periodical publisher C. Arthur Pearson. (Note: Pearson was a friend of his father.) He soon became Pearson's chief artist, leaving after six years to turn freelance.

In 1902, he married the fashion artist Charlotte Forge. The couple had two sons and one daughter.

== Work ==
From the age of 24 he pursued a successful freelance career and was published in The Graphic, The Strand Magazine, Punch, The Illustrated London News, and the Boys Own Paper. He illustrated a number of books including Louis Tracy's The Invaders in 1901 for Pearson.

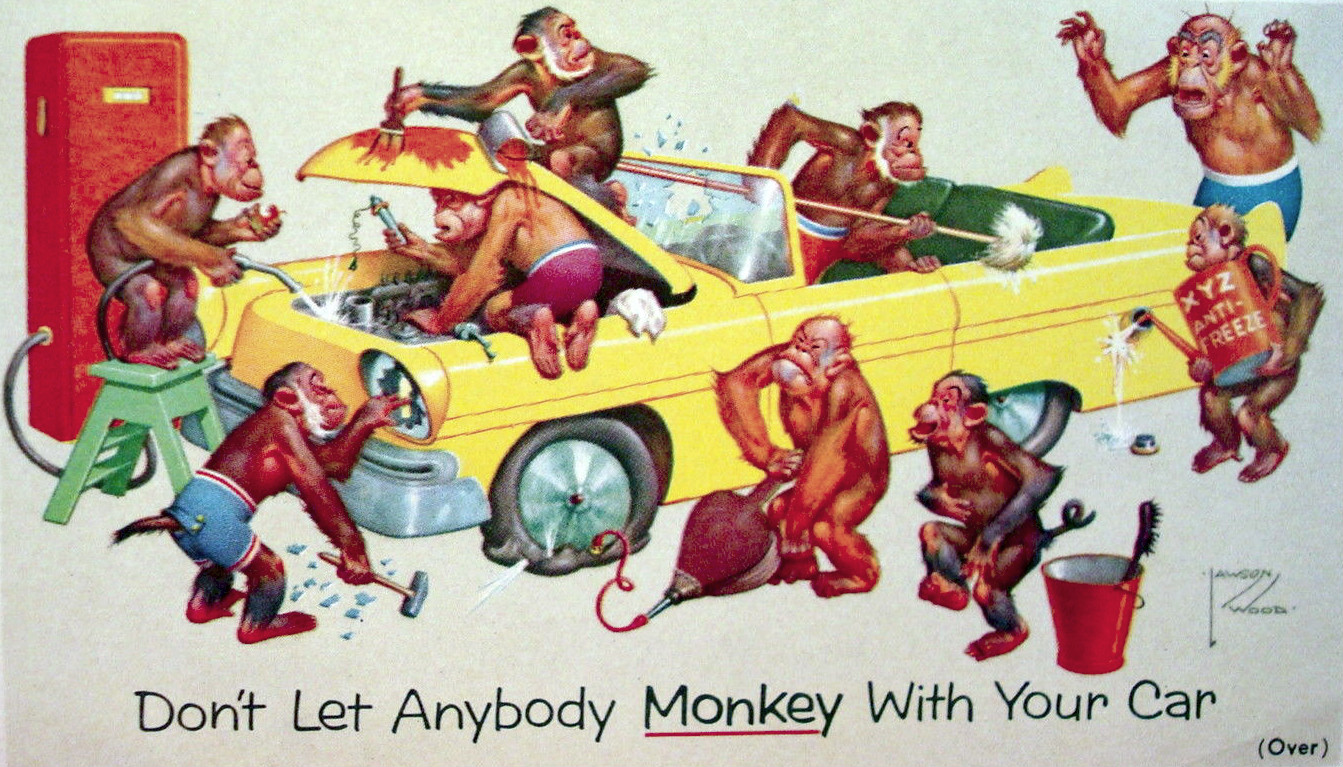
A Lawson Wood ad for Prestone Anti-Freeze.

His books include The Bow-Wow Book (1912), Rummy Tales (1920), The Noo-Zoo Tales (1922), Jolly Rhymes (1926), Fun Fair (1931), The Old Nursery Rhymes (1933), The Bedtime Picture Book (1943), Meddlesome Monkeys (1946) and Mischief Makers (1946). Frederick Warne of London a seried of Mr. books by Wood in 1916:Mr Prickles, Mr Quack, Mr Trunk, Mr Grunt, Mr Fox, and Mr Pup.

== Assessment ==
Peppin and Micklethwait stated that Wood's wide reputation as a humorous illustrator and commercial artist was based in part on astute management. He retained the copyright in his work and licensed it in Britain and abroad for posters, postcards, etc. Cran'pop was merchandised in pottery, calendars, postcards, and cigarette cards. Wood worked in pen and ink, pencils, chalk, and watercolour. He used a specially made enamel palette about one foot (300 mm) square and worked on Milburn Drawing Board at an architects desk.

Houfe said that most of Wood's work was "humorous in drawing and content, his repertoire of characters including peppery army officers, namby-pamby men and dominating old dames. The figures are heavily caricatured and he was one of the group of artists who made capital out of imaginary prehistoric scenes." Kelly calls a watercolour by Wood "a welcome holiday from the prehistoric monsters and chimpanzees on which he wasted so much talent." Peppin and Micklethwait cite Percy Bradshaw as saying the Wood had a "breadth, ease and fluency which many an infinitely more serious artist must envy".

== Later life ==
Wood lived in a 15th-century medieval manor house he moved brick by brick from Sussex to the Kent border. He died in Devon on 26 October 1957 at the age of 79.
