= Lewis Pinhorn Wood =

British landscape & watercolour artist (1848–1918)

- Born: 1848; Middlesex, England
- Died: 7 November 1918 (aged 69–70)
- Other names: L. Pinhorn Wood
- Occupations: landscapist, watercolourist
- Spouse: Louisa Howard Watson (m. 1875)
- Children: 4
- Relatives: Clarence Lawson Wood (son)

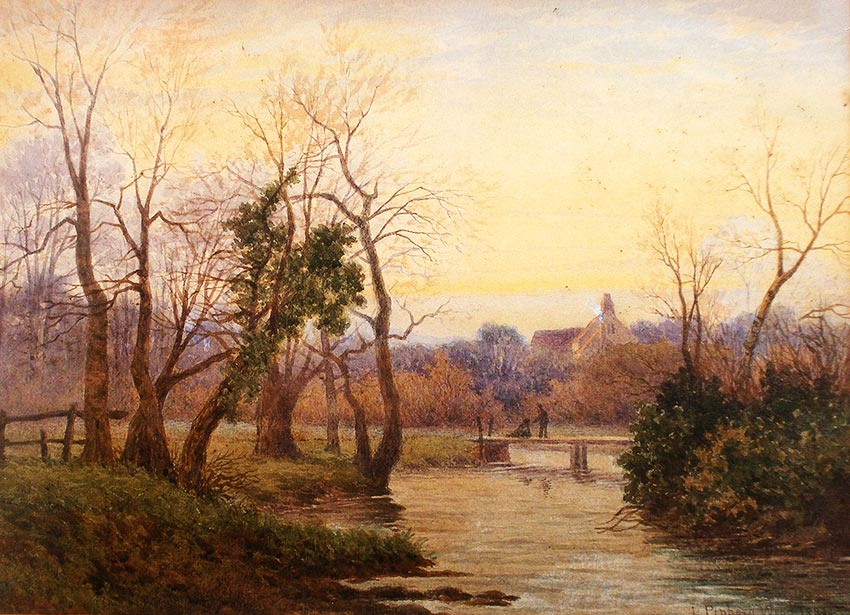
Evening on the Tillingbourne (1889) by Lewis Pinhorn Wood, painted near the Woods' family home in Shere

Lewis Pinhorn Wood (1848–1918) was a British landscapist and watercolourist, best known for his rural scenes of Sussex and Surrey. In the tradition of the Victorian era, his work depicted idyllic scenes of rural life across the home counties.

== Personal life ==
Born in Middlesex in 1848, his father was Lewis John Wood (1813–1901), the 19th-century architectural artist and lithographer renowned principally for his specialisation in architectural scenes from across Belgium and Northern France. In 1875, he married Louisa Howard Watson in the church of St Saviour in Hampstead, Middlesex. They had four children; the illustrator and designer Clarence Lawson Wood (1878–1957), Eveline, Esmond and Enid.

In early married life Pinhorn Wood lived and worked at Burnside in the village of Shere, Surrey, before moving to Highgate, London, and latterly to Homefield Road in Chiswick. In later life he lived in Pevensey, Sussex, where he registered as a member of the Sussex Archaeological Society in 1910, and died on 7 November 1918.

== Career ==
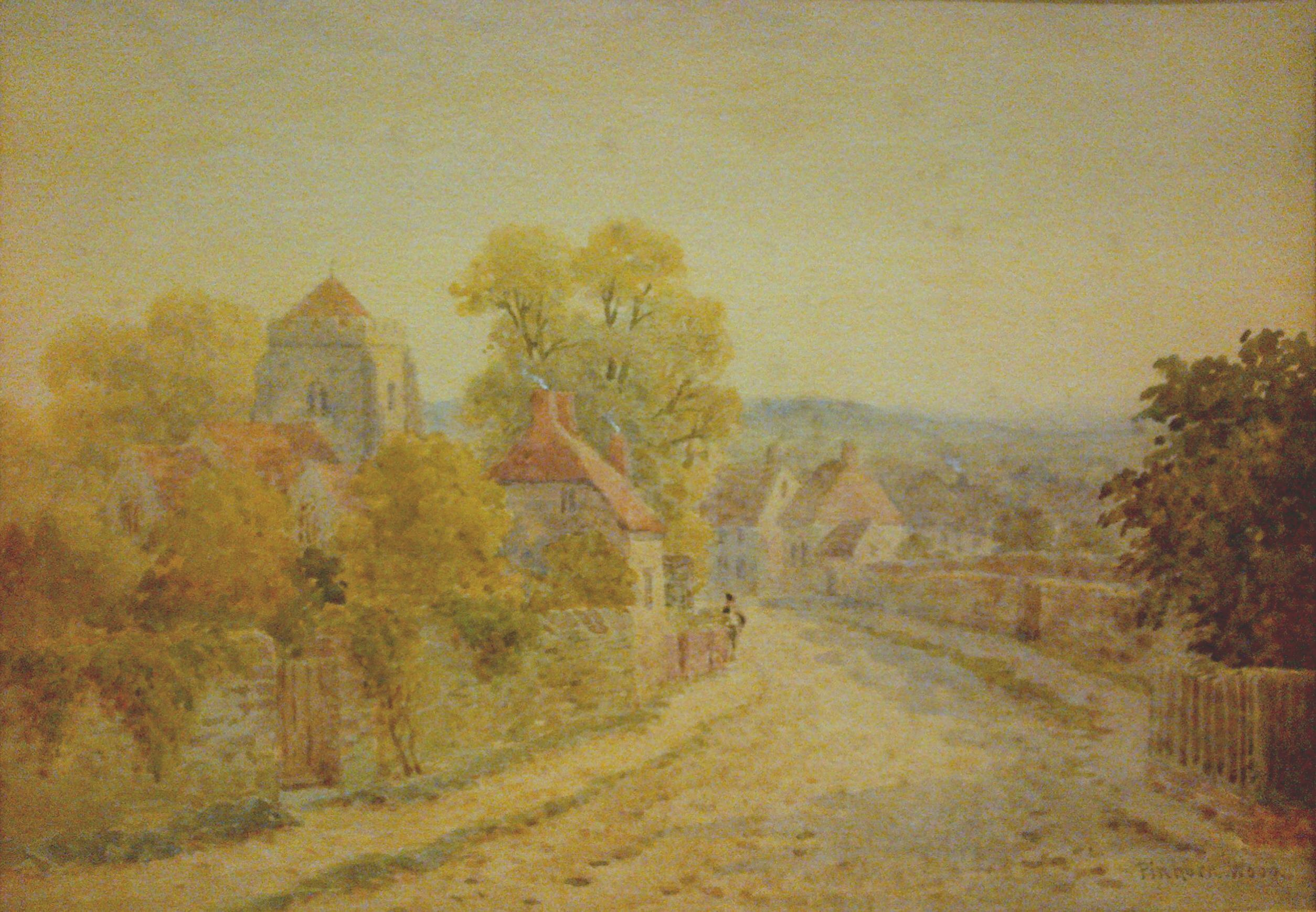
'Westham Church from Pevensey Castle looking west' by Lewis Pinhorn Wood

As a young man Wood studied at Heatherley’s School of Fine Art, and learnt to sketch on Hampstead Heath, near to the family home at 38 Park Road, Haverstock in Hampstead. His work was influenced by his father, who he accompanied on sketching trips around the UK, and on several of his painting tours of Northern Europe. His early work from these trips includes Rue de Hallage, Rouen (1869) and A Tyrolean Scene. He also studied at the West London School of Art, in Bolsover Street.

From 1873 to 1884 Wood worked as an art master at University College School in Hampstead, a job allowing him to continue his painting tours of the country, particularly during the summer months.

From the 1870s onward, Wood focussed on rural landscapes, working mainly in watercolour, but occasionally in oil, across Sussex, Surrey and some London Boroughs. His work played into the Victorian appetite for idyllic, sentimental scenes of rural life. He exhibited regularly in London at the Royal Academy, the Royal Institute of Painters in Water Colours, the Dudley Gallery, and elsewhere. He exhibited three times at the Royal Academy Summer Exhibition, with In the Meadows at Arundel (1876), As the tree falls, so must it lie (1877), and Wheat Field, near Fairley, Sussex (1881).

Pinhorn Wood also travelled widely around Britain in pursuit of iconic scenes beyond his mainstay of Surrey and Sussex. From early in his career he compiled an album of his travels entitled Sketches from Nature 1869–1908. Full of dated pencil and watercolour sketches, it provides a record of many of the places to which he ventured, including Cumbria in the summer of 1890, North Wales in the summer of 1891, and as far north as the Trossachs in Perthshire.

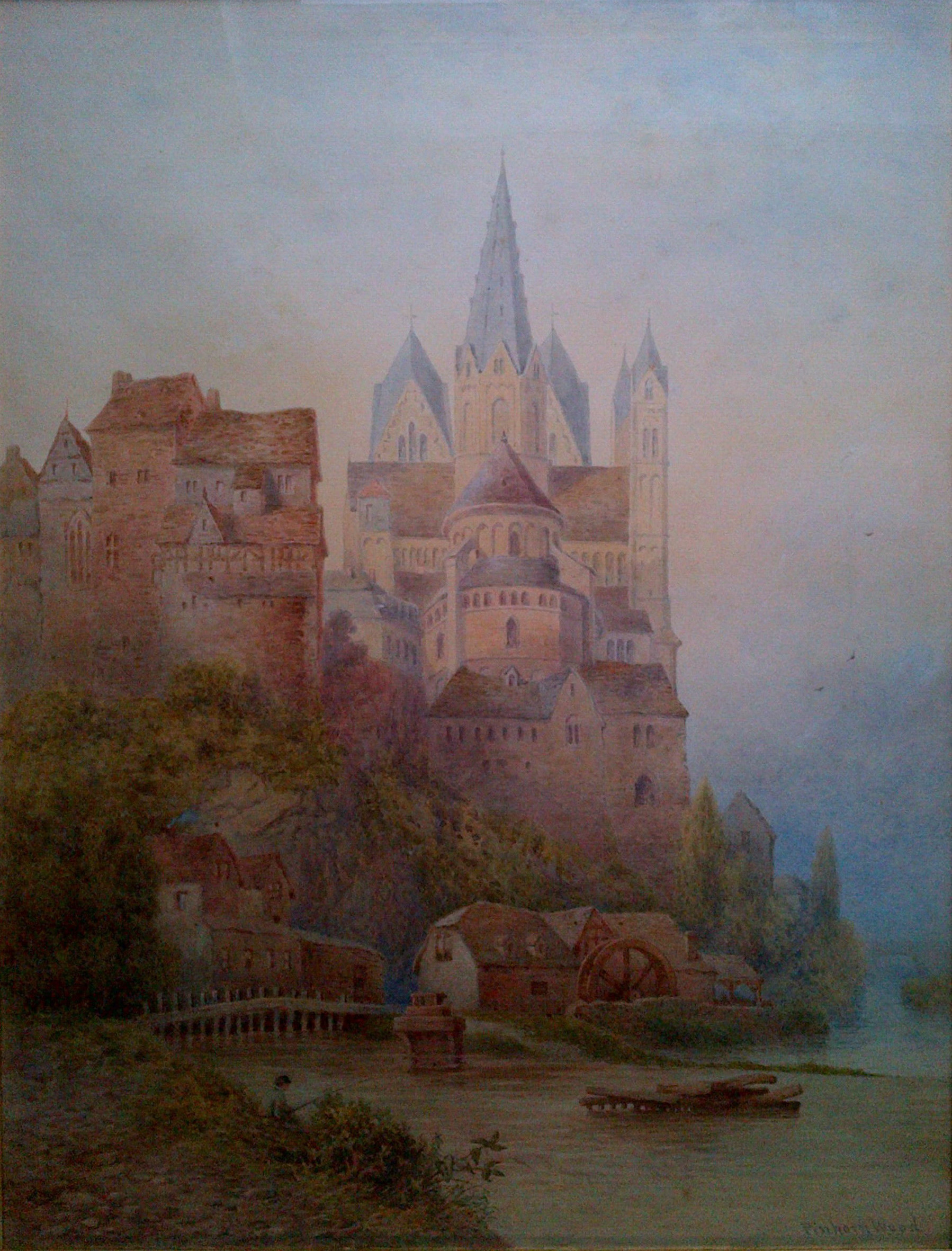
'Limburg an der Lahn' by Lewis Pinhorn Wood

In 1892 Wood returned to the continent to paint in towns in Northern France and travelled to Limburg in Germany, which his father had portrayed in his 1862 scene Limburg an der Lahn, Blick in die Altstadt mit dem Dom St. Georg. Paintings from Pinhorn Wood's trip included the substantial Limburg an der Lahn, an idyllic view across the Lahn river towards the castle and cathedral of Limburg.

In 1890, aged 41 and with a young family of four, he wrote a story for children entitled "Harry Goodchild's Day Dream: A Tale". The 28 page book was published by George Stoneman. The monthly magazine The Coming Day reviewed it as "A childish but rather pretty story about two children who were gifted with wings to enable them to fly for once to the moon".

In January 1901 he joined the Savage Club as an 'Art' member.

In April 1906 the Modern Gallery on New Bond Street, London, held an exhibition titled ‘Three Generations’, showing work by LJ Wood (cathedrals), Pinhorn Wood (landscapes) and Lawson Wood (humorous scenes) together. A similar exhibition of work from the three generations of the family was held by Walker’s Galleries of New Bond Street in February 1912.

In 1921 the art collector Arthur Myers Smith (1871–1936) donated three watercolours by Pinhorn Wood of the Belgian city of Namur, on the River Meuse, to the Victoria and Albert Museum. These first appeared on public display at V&A South Kensington in June 2009.

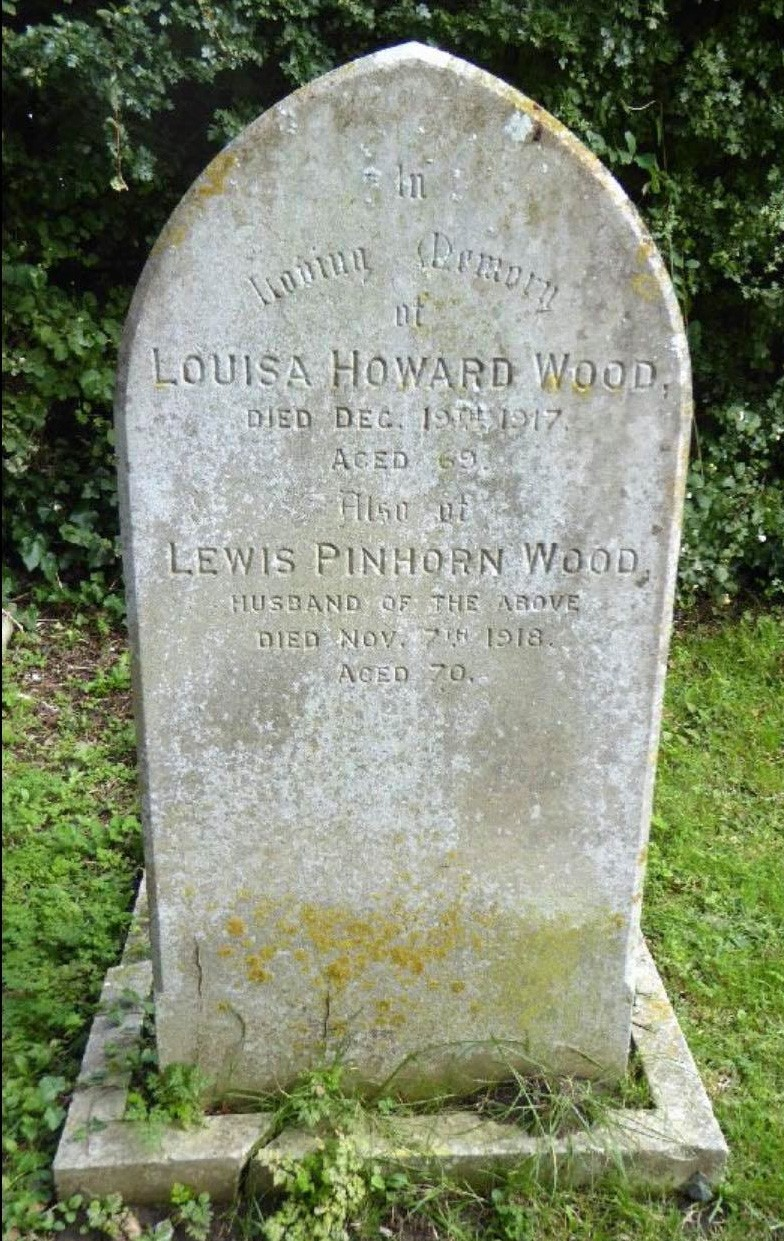
Lewis Pinhorn Wood and his wife Louisa were buried together in the graveyard of St Mary's Church in Westham, Sussex

== Selected works ==
- Rue de Hallage, Rouen (1869)
- A Tyrolean Scene
- Portrait of a figure in a hat (1872)
- Portrait of a Lady in Tudor Costume (1872)
- Cattle beside a lake (1874)
- Old Stables, Kenilworth Castle, Warwickshire (1875)
- A Bush Scene (1876)
- A girl carrying a bucket before a thatched cottage (1878)
- View of a thatched windmill (1878)
- Woodland Views of Surrey (1880)
- Gomshall, Surrey (1880)
- Upstream on the Rother, East Sussex (1882)
- Rustic Cottage (1884)
- Man and dog on a village lane in winter (1884)
- A Winter Landscape (1884)
- Country lane with figures (1884)
- The Millpool (1887)
- The Silent Pool, twilight (1888)
- Evening on the Tillingbourne (1889)
- Winter landscape with Anchor Inn (1890)
- Ashness Bridge - Keswick, Lake District (1890)
- Winter (1890)
- Cottage in lane (1892)
- Continental street scene (1892)
- Figure outside a cathedral (1892)
- Figures by a cathedral (1892)
- Man and dog walking along banks of river (1893)
- River view with cottages in the background (1893)
- The old church, Albury, Surrey (1894)
- Surrey valley (1895)
- Lewes from the Downs (1898)
- On the South Downs above Lewes (1898)
- A Surrey Common (1904)
- Rocky stream with mountains rising (1906)
- Houses at Hawkhurst, Kent (1908)
- Continental Castle with Windmill (undated)
- Continental street study 1 (undated)
- Continental street study 2 (undated)
- English cottage scene 1
- English cottage scene 2
- Arrival of a steamer at the Old Kew Bridge (undated)
- View of Shere, Surrey 1 (undated)
- Westham Church from Pevensey Castle looking West (undated)
- Levington village, Sussex (undated)
- Meadows before Pevensey Castle, East Sussex (undated)
- Castle grazing in the Village Meadows (undated)
- Near Hankham, Sussex (undated)
- Hampstead Heath (undated)
- Cornfields near Lancing, Sussex (undated)
- View of Hove, Sussex (undated)
- View of the cobbler's shop on the bridge, Ambleside (undated)
- Winter landscape with figure on country lane (undated)
- Suffolk waterside landscape with stone cottage (undated)
- River landscape with figures angling (undated)
- An estuary at dusk (undated)
- Figures on a track before an oak tree (undated)
- Windsor Castle (undated)
- Woman and dog passing a cottage (undated)
- A corner of Old Warwick (undated)
- At Tunbridge Wells (undated)
- Corn, Stooks
- Coastal view with rough seas (undated)
- A Surrey landscape (undated)
- Harvest scene (undated)
- Faggot Gatherers in Snow (undated)
- Walking the Dog (undated)
- Early Fishing Village (undated)
- Goathland Moor (undated)
- British Paddle Steamer docked in an estuary (undated)
- East Sussex view 1
- East Sussex view 2
- East Sussex view 3
- East Sussex view 4
- East Sussex view 5
