= Farley Green, Surrey =

Hamlet in Surrey, England

Coordinates: 51°11′56″N 0°29′08″W

Farley Green
- Hamlet
- Farley Green, Surrey

- Location within Surrey
- OS grid reference: TQ059454
- Civil parish: Albury
- District: Guildford
- Shire county: Surrey
- Region: South East
- Country: England
- Sovereign state: United Kingdom
- Post town: Guildford
- Postcode district: GU5
- Dialling code: 01483
- Police: Surrey
- Fire: Surrey
- Ambulance: South East Coast
- UK Parliament: Godalming and Ash

Farley Green is a small hamlet of Albury in the Greensand Ridge where it forms the south of the Surrey Hills AONB, to the south east of Guildford.

== History ==
On the outskirts of Farley Green, lies Farley Heath where one of Surrey's few Roman remains, a temple, can be found. The open heathland was the site of the largest Romano-British settlement in Surrey.

The site was excavated in 1848 by Martin Tupper, an antiquarian and poet, who lived in nearby Albury. Some of his finds are now housed in the British Museum. A Romano-Celtic Temple was in use some time before the end of the 1st century AD and was believed to be destroyed by fire around 450 AD. A number of pottery kilns, dating to the third or fourth centuries were also found. A subsequent excavation took place in 1926 led by S.E. Winbolt. The most recent archaeological excavation was undertaken by Surrey County Archaeological Unit, funded by English Heritage, in 1995. The full report was published in Surrey Archaeological Collections in 2007. The outline of the temple can still be seen and is marked out by stones set in concrete. The pond located on the green was used as a latrine pit by those living in the temple.

== Topography ==
The village houses spread mostly along Shophouse Lane which then becomes steep and narrow towards Winterfold Forest which ascends to more than 200 metres Above Ordnance Datum. The forest which climbs right to the summit of the Greensand Ridge is part of the Hurtwood and is where some of the Great Train Robbery proceeds were discovered, buried. The whole undulating area covering the south of Albury parish had been the haunt of smugglers in the distant past.

The hamlet has its own Anglican chapel, dedicated to St Michael, originally a barn built in the 19th century. The barn was given to the parish by Clara Courtenay-Wells, to be converted to a chapel of ease as a memorial to her late husband, who had died in 1929.

== Notable residents ==
- C. J. Allen (sculptor)
- Mary Quant (British fashion designer)
