= Colyers Hanger =

Protected area in Surrey, England

Coordinates: 51.224°N 0.518°W

- Site of Special Scientific Interest
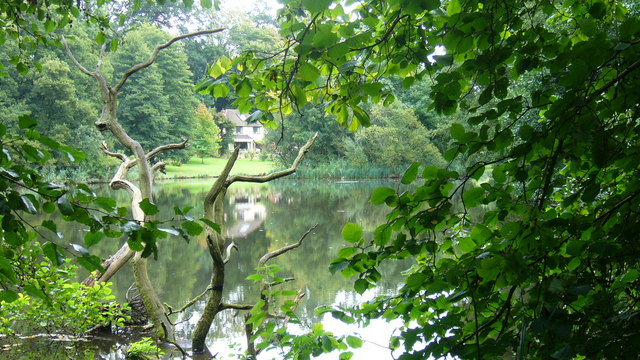
- Location of Colyers Hanger.
- Area of search: Surrey
- Grid reference: TQ 036 482
- Interest: Biological
- Area: 26.6 hectares (66 acres)
- Notification date: 1986
- Location map: Magic Map

Colyers Hanger is a 26.6-hectare (66-acre) biological Site of Special Scientific Interest south-east of Guildford in Surrey. It is a Nature Conservation Review site, Grade 2 and is part of St Martha's Hill and Colyer's Hanger nature reserve, which is managed by the Surrey Wildlife Trust.

This is an area of ancient forest on a south facing slope. It has a variety of woodland types due to the geological diversity of the escarpment at different levels. At the bottom is a stream with poorly drained woodland dominated by alder and a ground layer with plants such as marsh marigold and pendulous sedge.

Several public footpaths go through the site.
