= Chilworth, Surrey =

Village in Surrey, England

Coordinates: 51°12′51″N 0°32′18″W

Chilworth
- Village
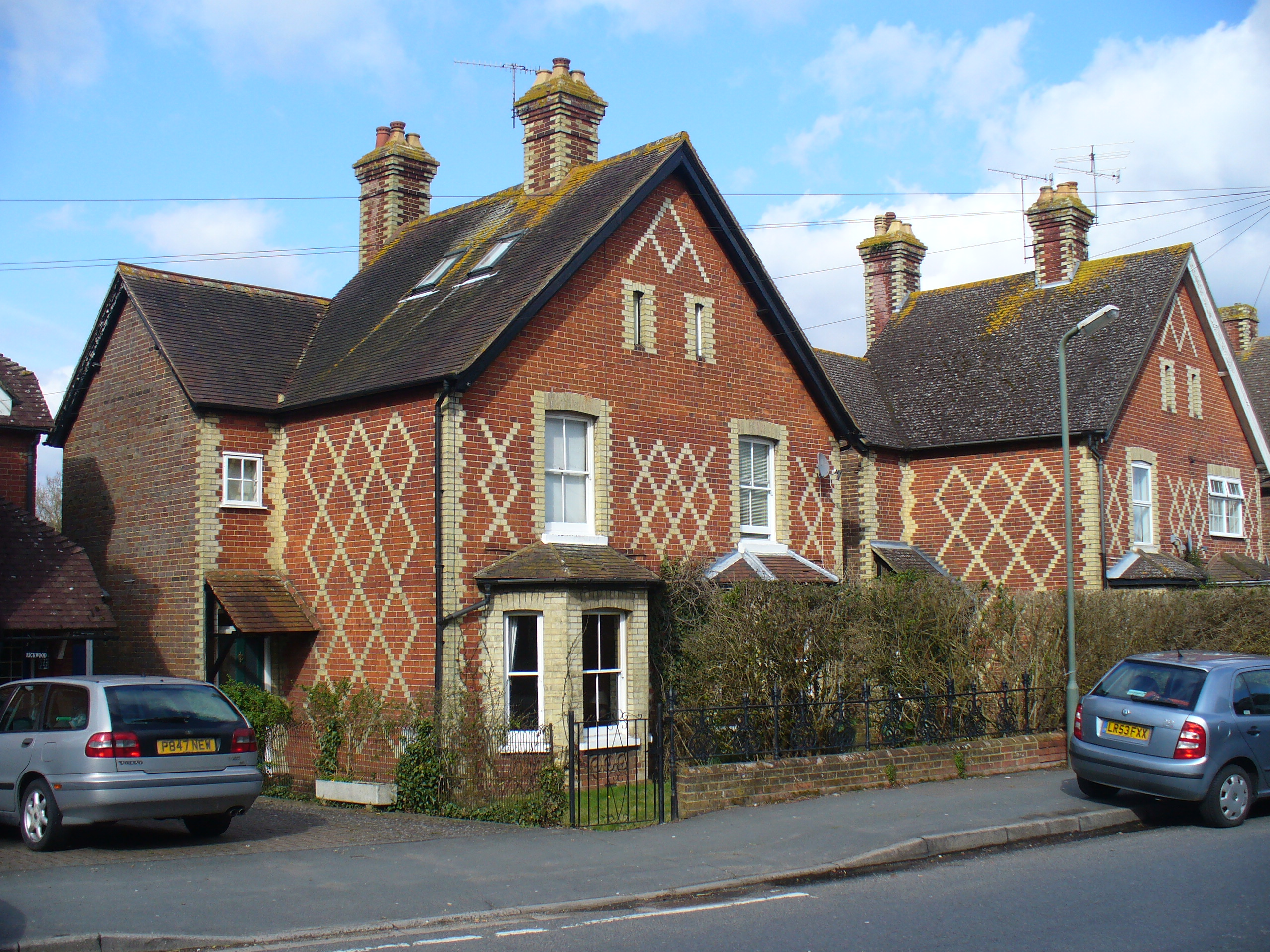
- Diamond pattern on village houses

- Location within Surrey
- Population: 1,928
- OS grid reference: TQ021471
- District: Guildford
- Shire county: Surrey
- Region: South East
- Country: England
- Sovereign state: United Kingdom
- Post town: Guildford
- Postcode district: GU4
- Dialling code: 01483
- Police: Surrey
- Fire: Surrey
- Ambulance: South East Coast
- UK Parliament: Godalming and Ash

Chilworth is a village in the Guildford borough of Surrey, England. It is located in the Tillingbourne valley, southeast of Guildford.

== Geography ==
The village is in the Surrey Hills AONB and most of its land is outside the settlement boundary within the Metropolitan Green Belt. The village occupies both sides of the Tillingbourne between those areas of the Greensand Ridge to the south, such as Tangley Hill, and the steep knoll called St Martha's Hill, with St Martha's Church on the summit, to the north. The North Downs are immediately north, east and west of that knoll. Footpaths, including the North Downs Way, lead through fields and long-established hillside woodlands along the ranges of hills. Chilworth is split between two civil parishes, Shalford to the west and the largely uninhabited St Martha's to the east, and is in the south-east of the borough of Guildford in the mid-west of Surrey.

=== Environment ===
Unlike most Surrey districts, the borough has no Air Quality Management Areas. Flooding from the Tillingbourne (alluvial flooding) is a rare occurrence with small parts of the north and west having been identified by the Borough Council as being at risk.

== History ==
Chilworth, as a landholding, appears in Domesday Book as Celeorde. It was held by Odo of Bayeux the Bishop of Bayeux. Its Domesday assets were: 1 mill worth 7s, 3 ploughs. It rendered £3 10s 0d.

The settlement has a rich industrial past. At various times in history it has been the location of a wire mill, paper mill and gunpowder factory. The wireworks were built in 1603 by Thomas Steere and others, who seduced workmen from the Tintern wireworks of the Company of Mineral and Battery Works. This infringed the latter company's patent and enabled it to have the wireworks suppressed in 1606.

Before the railway was built, Chilworth was a hamlet of a few cottages around the bridge over the Tillingbourne on the direct lane to Guildford via Tyting, where the main entrance to the gunpowder works was located. The second nucleus of settlement was the railway station, with its pub. A third nucleus was around a post office on the A248 in Shalford CP, which was known as "Shalford Hamlet" until around the Second World War. Since 2011 Benedictine monks have inhabited a hilltop monastery in the southern extreme of the parish of St Martha's, straddling northern Wonersh. Saint Augustine's Abbey, designed by Frederick Walters, was founded as a Franciscan friary in 1892.

Chilworth from the hill to the north

=== Chilworth Gunpowder Mills ===
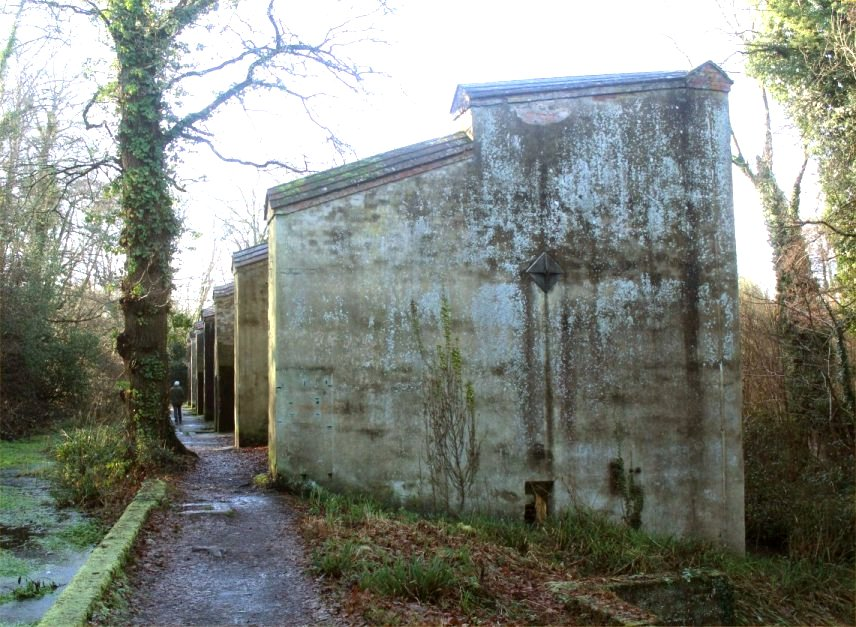
Ruins of old Gunpowder Mills north of the village

The Chilworth gunpowder mills were established in 1625 by the East India Company. They are located north of the village by the river Tillingbourne.

They were worked by a number of private companies, and became an important supplier of gunpowder to the Government. The Mills closed in 1920 after the 1914-18 war.

Today, a number of ruined buildings belonging to the gunpowder factory can still be found. The buildings and area are now partially looked after by Guildford Borough Council and English Heritage. The gunpowder works are listed as a scheduled monument.

== Chilworth Manor ==
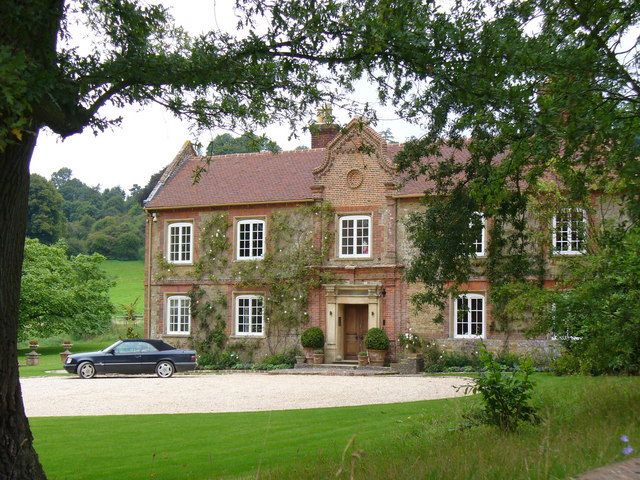
Chilworth Manor

Chilworth Manor is a large house between the 'village' (clustered centre) and St Martha's Hill to the north. It was part of the patrimony granted to Newark Priory when this monastery was founded in the late 12th century, and was administered as a monastic manor until the abbey was dissolved by Henry VIII. By 1580 the property was owned by one William Morgan. William's son, John, was knighted at Cadiz in 1596. In 1725 the widowed Sarah Churchill, Duchess of Marlborough, became the owner. She added the Marlborough Wing and developed a tiered garden excavated in the sloping hillside and still known as the "Duchess's Garden". Chilworth Manor is a grade II listed building and has recently been extensively restored and refurbished by new owners, following the death of its previous occupant, Lady Heald.

== Amenities ==
Chilworth has three churches, St Thomas', St Martha's, both CoE, and Chilworth Free Church as well as the Roman Catholic St Augustine's Abbey, south of the village. St Martha's is on the hill top north of the Village.

There are two schools, Chilworth Infant School and Tillingbourne Junior School; a gastro-pub, the Percy Arms and a village shop. The village has a recreation ground with a sports pavilion, used for football.

== Transport ==
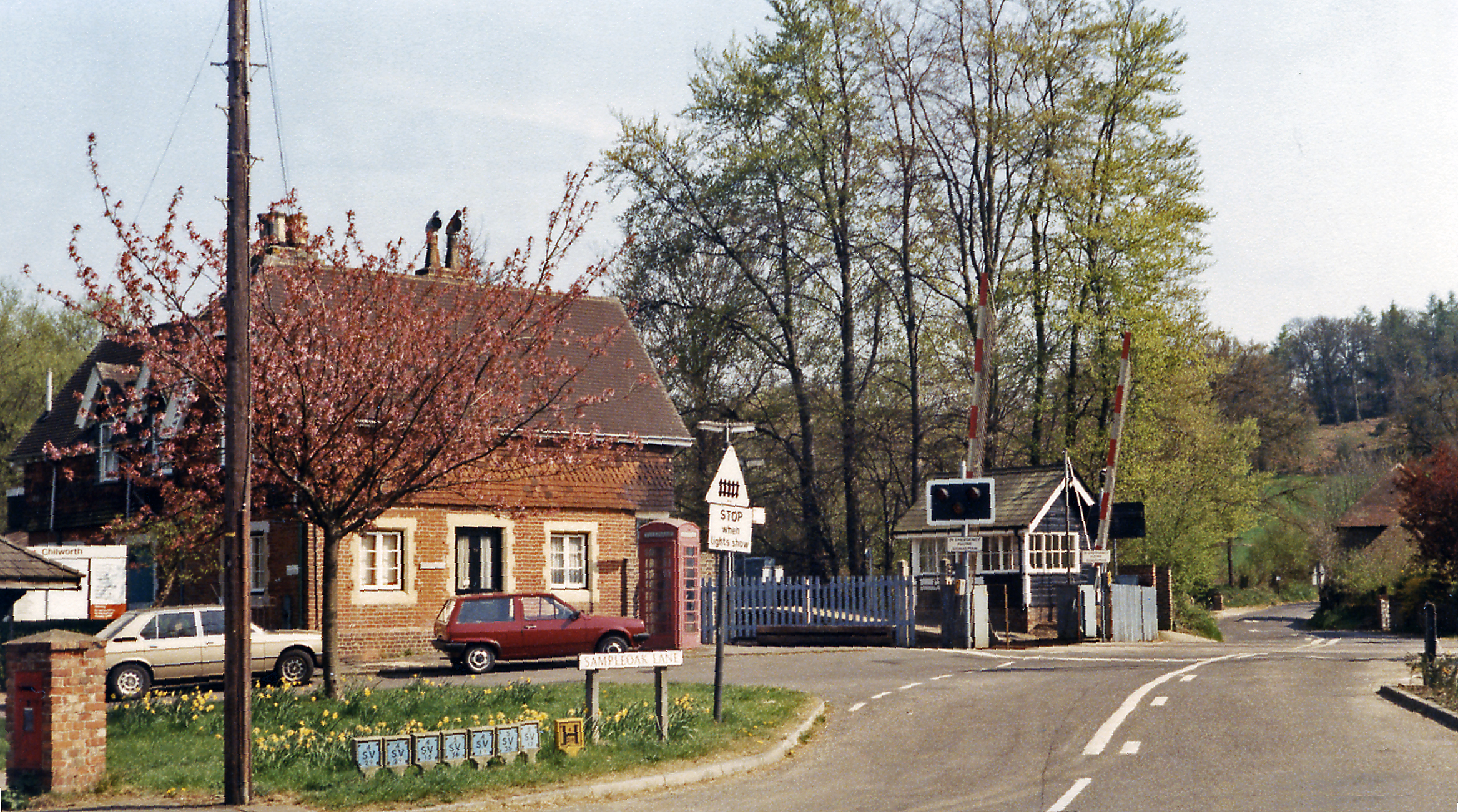
Chilworth railway station

Chilworth railway station is on the North Downs Line, and is served every two hours by trains to Gatwick Airport, Redhill and Reading. Trains are operated by the Great Western Railway.

The main road through the village is the A248 from Shere to Peasmarsh. Bus route number 32 connects Chilworth to Guildford, and Redhill via Dorking and is a basic hourly service, with a reduced service on Sundays. It is now operated by Compass Travel, after the route was given up by Arriva in 2014. Infrequent buses also run to Godalming (503) and Cranleigh (525).

The nearest airport is Farnborough, approximately 10 miles (16 km) to the north-west.

== Telecommunications ==
Chilworth is covered by ADSL, VDSL, Full fibre and Mobile Broadband based high speed internet services. A Vodafone phone mast is at the playing fields, just south of the Tangley level crossing. In 2011 BT extended their Fibre to the Cabinet service to cover Chilworth. This allowed for 12 Mbit/s+ services and service at the eastern end of the village and up to 70 Mbit/s to the west.

Broadband for Surrey Hills (B4SH) installed full fibre (FTTP) to the sparsely populated north edge of the village in mid-2021 and Roseacre Gardens to the east in December 2022. BT Openreach based full fibre broadband services became available to almost all of the village in March 2023. Gigaclear have also announced plans to cover the village.

== See also ==
- List of places of worship in Guildford (borough)
