= Newlands Corner =

Nature reserve in Guildford, Surrey, England

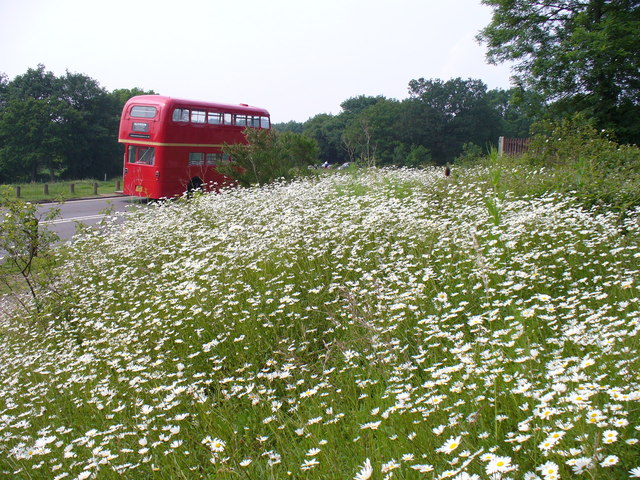

- Location within Surrey
- Type: Nature reserve
- Location: Guildford, Surrey
- OS grid: TQ044493
- Coordinates: 51°13′59″N 0°30′22″W
- Area: 103 hectares (250 acres)
- Manager: Surrey Wildlife Trust

Newlands Corner is a 103-hectare (250-acre) nature reserve east of Guildford in Surrey, England. It is owned by the Albury Estate. It used to be managed by the Surrey Wildlife Trust under an access agreement between the estate and Surrey County Council, but is no longer managed by them.

== Features ==
The site reaches 567 feet (173 m) with hill-grazed grass slopes below interspersed with trees. There are areas of chalk grassland and woodlands. Visible are some of the greatest prominences of the Western Greensand Ridge and the site lies on the North Downs Way. There are 129 ancient yews with a girth over 3.5m (over approx 500 years old) with some over 6m girth (probably at least 1000 years old) on the northern wooded slope. Some trees are so old the centre is hollow and the whole tree can be walked through.

Newlands Corner was a key location in the crime writer Agatha Christie's disappearance in December 1926. Her car was found in a bush overhanging a chalk pit at Newlands Corner, at the bottom of the south side of the hill. She was found some days later having checked in under an alias at a hotel in Harrogate. As a result, Newlands Corner is the setting of the climax of the final scene of the Doctor Who episode "The Unicorn and the Wasp".

Drove Road at Newlands Corner is a good site in the region for amateur astronomy as it is a dark sky site, close to London and its southern satellite towns. With a downhill slope facing south, the viewer faces many constellations such as Orion and Gemini in winter. Once or twice a year the Guildford Astronomical Society and other local societies hold public events at Newlands Corner with about 25 telescopes and 150 members of the public in attendance.

== Future plans ==
In October 2015, Surrey County Council announced the first stage of plans to cut funding of Surrey Wildlife Trust (SWT). The plans spawned an online petition, criticism from the local residents and parish councils in the area, and a "Save Newlands Corner" website. In July 2018, parking charges were introduced, although plans for development of a restaurant, shops, and coach park were halted.

== Gallery ==
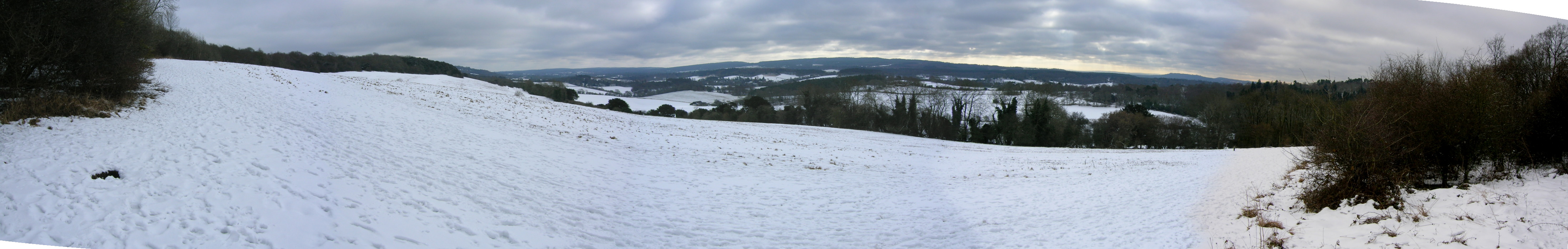
Panorama view south

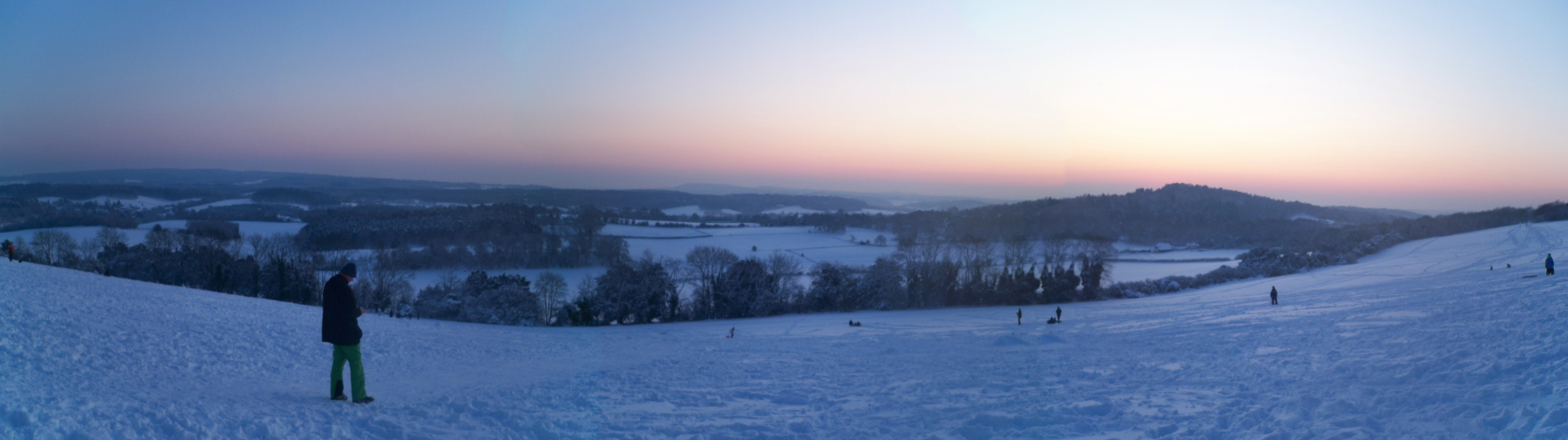
Panorama view south west

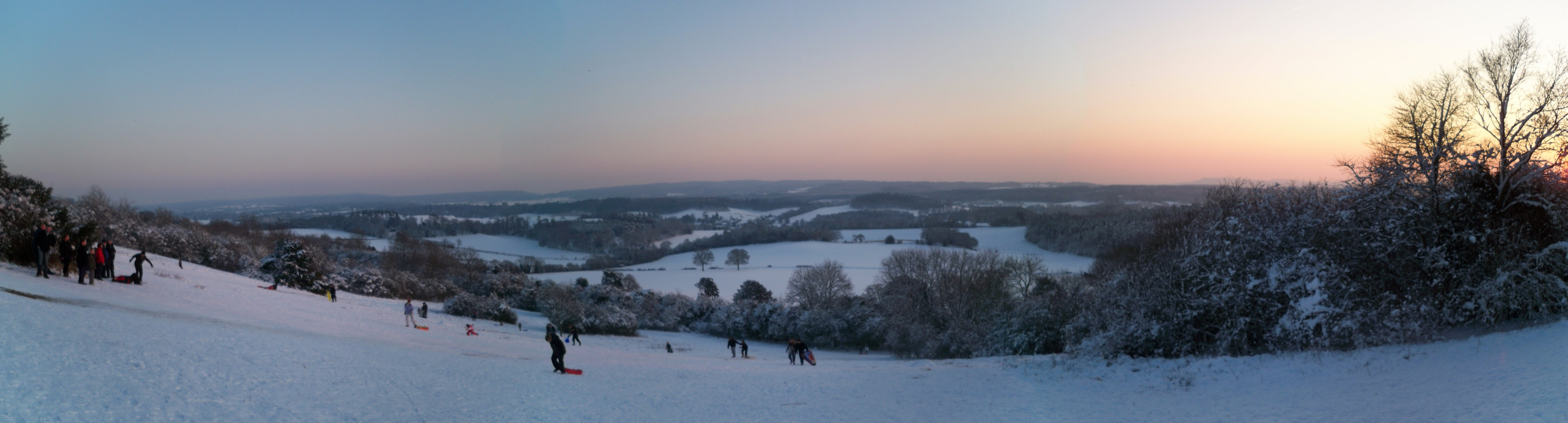
Panorama view south east
