= The Anchoress =

The Anchoress may refer to:

- The Anchoress (book), a 2015 novel
- The Anchoress (musician), stage name of musician Catherine Anne Davies
- Anchoress (film), a 1993 British film

== See also ==
- Anchoress, a type of female religious recluse
