= Anchorite (disambiguation) =

An anchorite (feminine form anchoress) is a Christian person who lives in strict physical separation from secular society.

Anchorite or Anchoress may also refer to:

- The Anchorite, a 1976 Spanish film
- HMS Anchorite (P422), a Royal Navy submarine of the Second A Class
- Anchorite, a kind of Azalea (Glenn Dale hybrid)
- Anchorite, a member of the Aldor religious order in World of Warcraft
- Anchoress (film), a 1993 British film
- The Anchoress (book), a 2015 novel
- The Anchoress (musician), an indie rock act
- Anchorite (Love You Very Much), a song on the 2012 album Monomania by Car Seat Headrest
