= Misericorde: Volume One =

2023 video game

- Developer: Xeecee
- Publisher: Xeecee
- Platform: Windows
- Release: March 23, 2023
- Genre: Kinetic novel
- Mode: Single-player

Misericorde: Volume One is an indie mystery kinetic novel developed and published by Xeecee, and the first of a planned episodic trilogy. It was released for Windows on March 24, 2023. Set in a convent in England in the year 1482, the game revolves around a murder that was committed within the premises. The game's main character, Hedwig, is an anchoress who was confined to a cell, and therefore had a foolproof alibi. She is forced by the convent's mother superior to leave her cell and assist in finding the culprit. The game's art is monochrome, with retro game-style heavily dithered photograph backgrounds and anime character sprites. The game received positive reviews from critics for its writing, citing its memorable characters as a strong point.

== Gameplay ==
Screenshot of dialog between two characters

As a kinetic novel, the gameplay consists solely of advancing through dialog without any choices on the part of the player. Characters are shown as 2D sprites on a background. After finishing the main story, a chapter select, image gallery, list of character profiles, and music player are unlocked. One secret scene is accessible by solving a simple puzzle in the gallery.

Solo developer Xeecee drew the character art, wrote the story, and composed the music. In the credits, they are credited for the music under the pseudonym Lamonaca Dimonza, Italian for The Nun of Monza.

== Plot ==
In 1483, the anchoress Hedwig begins to recount the story of what happened at her convent, Linbarrow Abbey, the year prior to someone outside of her cell.

In 1482, Hedwig is visited in her cell by the mother superior of the abbey, who reveals that one of the sisters, Catherine, was murdered with a sword, and conscripts Hedwig to investigate. Hedwig is introduced to the others as the new chronicler, which had previously been Catherine's job, but adapts poorly to life outside her cell and doubts her investigative abilities. She is also troubled by recurrent sightings of a demon wearing armor and wielding a sword. She uncovers that the prime suspect, a local peasant named James, has an alibi that one of the sisters can vouch for. She also finds a magic circle carved inside a wall adjacent to her cell.

One night, in the convent's misericord, the demon appears to menace Hedwig and the others. It trips and knocks its helmet off, revealing it to be Eustace, the convent's sacristan who had previously warned Hedwig to stop her investigation. However, Eustace denies having been present for the other sightings of the demon. In an effort to mend their relationship, the mother superior assigns Hedwig and Eustace to run an errand to a nearby town, along with Moira, the convent's infirmerer. Overwhelmed by stress, Hedwig experiences a vision of flying into the mountains and seeing God.

Upon returning to Linbarrow, the rest of the nuns throw Hedwig a surprise birthday party. She is later invited to Catherine's makeshift wake, where the nuns use a sword to destroy barrels of sherry Catherine had helped work on. Hedwig finally begins to feel ingratiated into the abbey. However, the next day, one of the nuns, Flora, has gone missing. After a few days, Hedwig decides to investigate the hallway of her cell, where she finds Flora fleeing the demon. The two manage to fight it off, but Flora's leg is crushed by a heavy door.

In 1483, Hedwig stops the story, saying that it is becoming difficult to recount. She gives her listener her notes and sends them away for the day. In a secret post-credit scene, the perspective shifts to the United States in the 1980s, where a woman named Alex boards a plane to England, planning to visit Linbarrow Abbey.

== Reception ==
Maddy Myers of Polygon praised the chemistry between characters, describing the game as both haunting and "quite humorous". Calling it "rare to see an ensemble cast this well developed and characterized", she stated that it was one of her favorite games of the year, saying that each nun had her own distinct voice and secrets. She stated that she was so interested in seeing the second episode that she subscribed to the developer's Patreon after beating the game. Jen Lennon of The A.V. Club put Misericorde on her list of top games of 2023, calling the game "devastating" and comparing it to Pentiment, though she noted that game's element of player choice. She called the lack of choice fitting, as the game was about Hedwig taking control of her life and telling her own story. William Hughes of the same publication said that the game drew players in with "considerable skill" and that it was one of the year's most involving narratives. Elijah Gonzalez of Paste rated it the 4th best game of the year, saying that it "completely absorbed" him in its setting, and calling the wait for the next chapter "painful". He noted that the game "establishes a cast of characters who prove just as complex as its political machinations". Ashley Bardhan of Kotaku called Misericorde one of the best games of Steam's 2023 Visual Novel Fest, describing the art as "fantastic".

== Legacy ==
The second episode of the game, Misericorde Volume Two: White Wool and Snow, was released on December 29, 2024.
