= Misericorde: Volume Two =

2024 video game

Misericorde Volume Two: White Wool & Snow
- Developer: Xeecee
- Publisher: Xeecee
- Platform: Windows
- Release: December 29, 2024
- Genre: Kinetic novel
- Mode: Single-player

Misericorde Volume Two: White Wool and Snow is an indie mystery kinetic novel developed and published by Xeecee, and the second of a planned episodic trilogy. It was released for Windows on December 29, 2024. Set in a convent in England in the year 1482, the game follows the story of the first game where the protagonist Hedwig, is an anchoress who was confined to a cell, is forced by the convent's mother superior to leave her cell and assist in solving a murder within the premises.

== Plot ==
Gameplay screenshot.

In 1483, a visitor returns to the cell of the anchoress Sister Hedwig at Linbarrow Abbey. She continues her account of her investigation into Sister Catherine's death at the abbey the previous year. (Note: As depicted in Misericorde: Volume One)

In 1482, after Hedwig and Flora escape the demon in the abbey's upper hall, Hedwig awakens her sisters to help fix Flora's broken leg, alerting the abrasive prioress Angela to Hedwig's actions. Over the course of the next few days, Hedwig tries to covertly get the account of Sister Katherine, who was having sex with the prime suspect, James, when the murder happened. However, she notices multiple instances of romantic conduct between the other sisters, and eventually realizes, to her consternation, that most of them are lesbians. Hedwig's investigation is also complicated by both Angela, who tries to convince her to explore other avenues of investigation, and Eustace, the sacristan, who tries to make her stop investigating.

During a ceremony where two new nuns, Brigid and Violet, are being inducted to the abbey by the visiting Bishop Richard, Hedwig collapses from stress and is taken to her room. Upon waking up, a sudden burst of energy compels her to run around the abbey, and eventually to take off her clothes, which gratifies her. She is discovered by Eustace and Angela, who reveals later that night that she is also an exhibitionist and offers to give her sexual favors if the investigation goes well. Conflicted, Hedwig visits Katherine and gets her story, but denies her advances.

Hedwig, Angela and the Mother Superior visit James in the hospitalum, where they find a magic circle akin to the one in the abbey and a mentally unstable James ranting about someone who visits his cell. Later, Hedwig investigates the library after a fire breaks out inside, and finds evidence of a demonic ritual in the sacristy and rows of empty shelves. While attempting to clarify part of Katherine's story, she confesses to Hedwig that she took vows at the abbey to escape punishment for murdering her husband.

After Hedwig shows Angela the shelves, she confesses to being frightened, and accepts a supernatural element to the murders. The two have sex in Hedwig's cell. Emboldened, Hedwig goes to the Superior and lays out her case, pinning the murder on Eustace. When she leaves, she is confronted by the rest of the congregation, who tell her they've caught on to her investigation and try to convince her to stop prying. Hedwig pretends to agree. To celebrate, Eustace organizes a party on a hill outside the abbey, during which Angela catches Hedwig having sex with another sister and storms off. The party ends when the nuns realize Flora, Brigid and Violet have gone missing.

Upon returning to the abbey, the congregation organizes search parties for the missing nuns. During a meeting, Katherine is ordered to the Superior's office, and Hedwig realizes that Angela told the Superior that Katherine was the murderer. Furious, she tells Angela she never loved her. Later, she is also summoned to the Superior's office, but when she arrives, the demon appears behind the Superior and kills her, chasing Hedwig around the abbey with a sword. Eventually, she tires it out, and it gives the sword to her, motioning for her to cut its armor off. (Note: The demon tells Hedwig that it is forced to hurt people by the Devil. However, this message is rendered in an illegible font, and is not understood in-universe.) Instead, she slices its head open, revealing it to be James.

In 1483, Hedwig concludes by telling her listener that she locked herself back in her cell after these events. She explains that Angela became the abbey's mother superior, Flora, Brigid and Violet are still missing, and the murder remains unsolved, and laments her inadequacy and sinfulness. The listener then unlocks the cell door.

Interspersed with this narrative is a series of vignettes from the perspective of Alex, an American woman who travels to the ruins Linbarrow in 1982 and becomes implicated in a plot to kill Margaret Thatcher.

== Reception ==
Misericorde Volume Two: White Wool and Snow was included in the 2025 Steam Visual Novel Fest.

== See also ==
- Misericorde: Volume One
