= Book of the Anchorite of Llanddewibrefi =

14th-century Welsh manuscript

The full text of Llyfr Ancr Llanddewibrefi as a pdf file

The Book of the Anchorite of Llanddewibrefi (also Jesus ms. 119) (Welsh: Llyfr Ancr Llanddewibrefi or Llyfr yr Ancr) is a fourteenth-century Welsh manuscript containing a collection of religious texts translated from Latin to Welsh. Notable works in the manuscript includes the Elucidarium, Historia Lucidar, Ymborth yr Enaid, Breuddwyd Pawl and the Prester John text Ystorya Gwlat Ieuan Vendigeit. It is dated in a colophon to Historia Lucidar to the year 1346.

The scribe identifies himself as an anchorite, but remains otherwise anonymous. He also states in the manuscript that it was commissioned by Gruffydd ap Llywelyn ap Phylip ap Trahaearn of Cantref Mawr in Carmarthenshire. At the end of the seventeenth or beginning of the eighteenth century, it was given to Jesus College, Oxford, and is currently housed in the Bodleian Library in Oxford.

== Bibliography ==
- Thomas Jones, 'The Book of the Anchorite of Llanddewi Brefi', Transactions and Archaeological Record, Cardiganshire Antiquarian Society, 12 (1937), 63–82
- Sarah Rowles, 'Yr Elucidarium: Iaith, strwythur, cynnwys ac arwyddocâd y cyfieithiadau Cymraeg', PhD dissertation, Aberystwyth University, 2008.
