= Chris Newby =

British film director and screenwriter (born 1957)

Christopher Newby (born 1957, Leeds, England) is a British film director and screenwriter.

He studied at Leeds Polytechnic and The Royal College of Art in London. He has made several short films, including The Old Man and the Sea, an evocative juxtaposition of marine, religious and body imagery, and Relax (a short film about a gay man awaiting the results of an HIV test, drifting into moments of fantasy). It won the Teddy Award in 1991.

He directed Anchoress (1993), a tale of paganism versus matriarchal Christianity set in a Surrey village in the early fourteenth century. It was screened in the Un Certain Regard section at the 1993 Cannes Film Festival. In 1995, he directed Madagascar Skin, which starred John Hannah and Bernard Hill. He has continued to make short films, including Stromboli (1997) and Flicker (2001).
