= Nazarena of Jesus =

American Roman Catholic nun and anchoress

Nazarena of Jesus, OSBCam (October 15, 1907 – February 7, 1990), was an American Camaldolese, who spent most of her adult life in a monastery as an anchoress or recluse.

== Life ==
She was born Julia Crotta on October 15, 1907, in Glastonbury, Connecticut, the youngest of seven children of Italian immigrant parents. She studied at the Hartford Conservatory, then piano, violin (with Hugo Kortschak), and composition (with David Stanley Smith and Richard Donovan) at the Yale School of Music. During a Holy Week retreat in 1934, she reportedly had a religious experience that was to have a profound effect on her. She matriculated at Albertus Magnus College. After college, she worked briefly in the Catskills and as a secretary in Manhattan.

To discern a possible monastic vocation, Crotta joined the monastery of Our Lady of Mount Carmel and Saint Thérèse of the Child Jesus, in Newport, Rhode Island. She left after about three months, seeking a more solitary way of life. Traveling to Rome, she joined the Camaldolese nuns of Sant'Antonio on the Aventine Hill. She remained for about a year, when her superior recommended she try the Carmel once more. In 1938, she entered the Carmel of the Reparation, where she eventually made her simple vows. However, due to the wartime food shortages and the austere fasting the nuns practiced, in July 1944, just before her solemn vows, Julia left to take a job in a soup kitchen. She later found a job at the Allied Financial Agency.

Following a private audience with Pope Pius XII, Crotta was invited into the Camaldolese monastery in Rome on November 21, 1945, to live as a recluse or anchoress. She then took the religious name Maria-Nazarena of Jesus.

Nazarena was to remain in a secluded cell in that monastery, leading a strict ascetic regime for the rest of her life, hearing Mass through a grille and receiving her food and messages from the abbess and the other nuns through a slot in the door to her cell. She spoke to no one directly, except once a year, when she spoke to the priest who served as her spiritual director. Those meetings could last an entire day, during which she would talk for hours.

As a Camaldolese, Nazarena pronounced her temporary vows on December 15, 1947, and made her solemn vows on May 31, 1953. Pope Paul VI visited the monastery on Ash Wednesday of 1966 (February 23 that year), and blessed Nazarena through the grille, while she wore a black veil covering her face.

== Death and legacy ==
She died at the monastery on February 7, 1990, aged 82.

On November 21, 2013, during a visit to the Camaldolese monastery, Pope Francis visited Sister Nazarena's cell.
