= Harry Edwards (healer) =

English spiritual healer (1893–1976)

Harry James Edwards
- Born: 29 May 1893; Islington, London, England, United Kingdom
- Died: 7 December 1976 (aged 83)
- Occupations: Self proclaimed Spiritual Healer, faith healer

Harry James Edwards (29 May 1893 – 7 December 1976) was a self-proclaimed spiritual healer, teacher and author who had a career of nearly 40 years.

== Early years ==
Born in Islington, London as one of nine children, Harry Edwards was the son of printer and a dressmaker. In 1905, aged 12, Edwards joined the London Diocese Church Lads Brigade. In 1907 he left school and began a seven-year apprenticeship to a printer. Dissatisfied with that career, he developed political aspirations and joined the local branch of the Liberal Party, for whom he campaigned.

On the outbreak of World War I in 1914 Edwards enlisted in the Royal Sussex Regiment and by late 1915 he was in Bombay en route for Tekrit, where he worked to build the railway track between there and Baghdad. He was commissioned in the field, and achieved the rank of captain. In 1921 he returned to the UK and married Phyllis. The couple opened a stationer's shop and printing works in Balham, and Edwards tried to launch himself into a political career, standing for parliamentary and council seats as a Liberal candidate on several occasions, but with no success. By this stage he also had four children to support.

== Spiritual healing ==
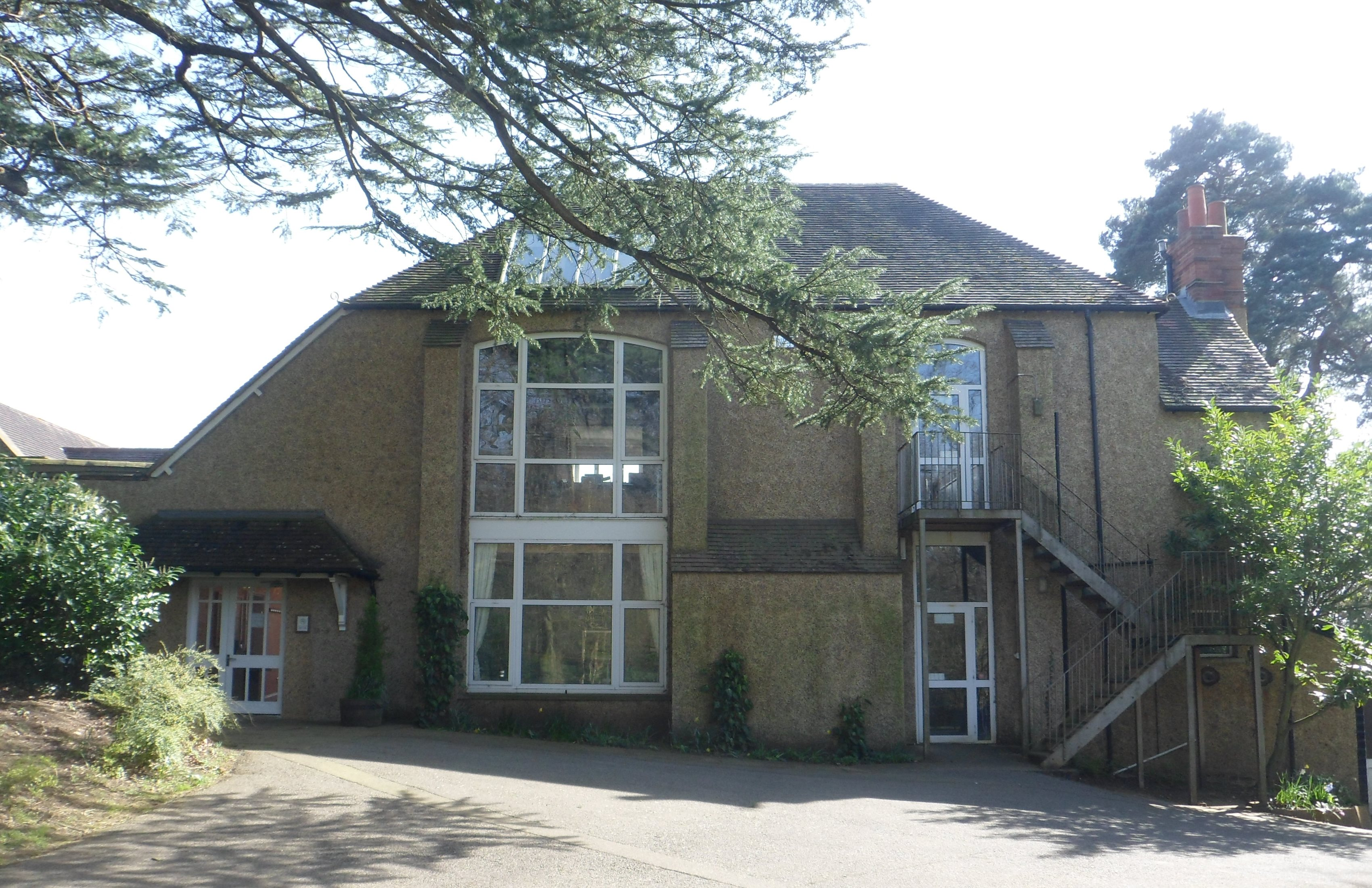
The Harry Edwards Spiritual Healing Sanctuary at Shere, Surrey

Edwards became a spiritual healer when he attended a meeting at a spiritualist church in 1935 and was told by the mediums present that he had healing powers. His early attempts at spiritual healing were met with success, and gradually his reputation as a healer spread and his services became more in demand. During the Second World War Edwards served in the Home Guard and continued to run his printing business alongside his now growing practice as a healer. Gradually, as his fame spread, his healing took over from his printing business, which was later to be run by a brother. He moved to Stoneleigh in Surrey just after the war, where he used the front room of his house as a healing sanctuary.

Eventually, because of the increasing number of patients visiting him Edwards outgrew this home, so in 1946 he moved his family and his healing practice to Burrows Lea, a large house with several acres of gardens and woodland in Shere, where he founded the 'Harry Edwards Healing Sanctuary'. As his fame as a healer spread he was receiving 10,000 letters a week asking for help and distance healing.

In 1948 Edwards held a healing demonstration in Manchester which was attended by 6,000 people. In September 1951 during the Festival of Britain he appeared at the Royal Festival Hall in London, where he demonstrated spiritual healing to a packed hall. In 1954 he became the first President of the National Federation of Spiritual Healers (NFSH). Edwards visited the island of Cyprus for his initiation into Daskalos' inner circle "The Researchers of Truth". The ceremony took place on 1 April 1954.

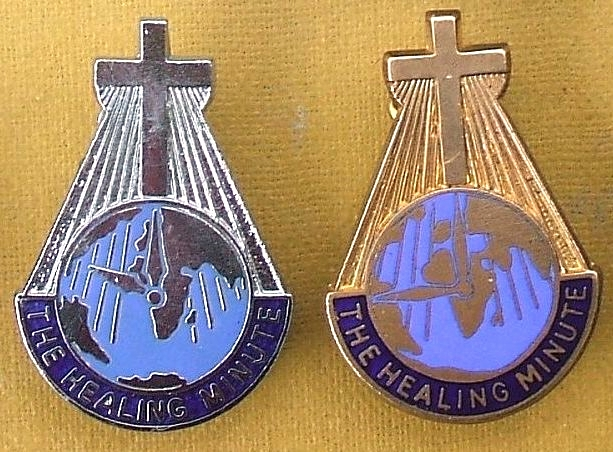
The Healing Minute, Harry Edward's Healing Sanctuary - member's badges

An 'Archbishops' Commission on Divine Healing' was set up in 1953 to investigate spiritual healing, and Edwards addressed the Commission in 1954, providing it with documentary evidence of a number of cases of successful healing for it to examine. At the same time he held a public demonstration in front of 6,000 people at the Royal Albert Hall to launch the '10 o'clock Healing Minute'. The commission's report, published in 1958, stated that neither the Church or the medical profession accepted the claims of spirit healers that they were responsible for successful healings. Despite the fact that Harry Edwards had appeared before the Commission he was never sent a copy of the final report.

Edwards claimed that several deceased scientists worked through him, including Joseph Lister and Louis Pasteur. The founder of the Aetherius Society, George King was complimentary of his healing powers.

Harry Edwards died in December 1976 aged 83.

== Sceptical reception ==
A study in the British Medical Journal (Rose, 1954) investigated spiritual healing, therapeutic touch and faith healing. In a hundred cases that were investigated, no single case revealed that the healer's intervention alone resulted in any improvement or cure of a measurable organic disability. Edwards claimed he had cured about a hundred thousand people in Britain but Rose could not verify a single cure by Edwards. Rose visited a healing session held by Edwards and observed that an old lady had claimed to have been cured during the session and had walked without her sticks, but by the time the session was over was walking with two sticks out of the hall.

== Bibliography ==
- Edwards, Harry Harry Edwards: Thirty Years a Spiritual Healer Jenkins (1968)
- Edwards, Harry A Guide for the Development of Mediumship Spiritualist Aszon, [n.d.]
- Edwards, Harry The Science of Spirit Healing Rider & Co, New York (1943)
- Edwards, Harry The Mediumship of Jack Webber Rider & Co, New York (1940)
- Edwards, Harry A Guide to the Understanding and Practice of Spiritual Healing The Healer Publishing Company Limited (1974)
- Edwards, Harry The Mediumship of Arnold Clare Rider & Co, New York (1941)
- Edwards, Harry Psychic Healing Spiritualist Press Ltd., London (1946)
- Edwards, Harry Life in Spirit : with a Guide for the Development of Mediumship Healer Publishing Co. Ltd (1976)
- Edwards, Harry The Power of Healing, Tandem Publishing (1967)
- Edwards, Harry with Paul Miller The Science, Art and Future of Spirit Healing Healer Publishing Company, Ltd (1975)
- Edwards, Harry, " The Healing Intelligence"
- Edwards, Harry, " A Guide for the Development of Mediumship"
- Newman, F Terry, "The Spiritual Healer" journal, Editor.

== Select bibliography ==
- Branch, Ramus Harry Edwards : the Story of the Greatest Healer Since the Time of Christ Guildford (1982)
- Miller, Paul Harry Edwards, the Healer The Spiritualist Press, London (1948)
- Miller, Paul Born to Heal : a Biography of Harry Edwards, the Spirit Healer The Spiritualist Press, London (1962)
- Barbanell, Maurice Harry Edwards and His Healing The Spiritualist Press, London (1953)
