= Christina Carpenter =

14th century English Anchoress

Christine Carpenter
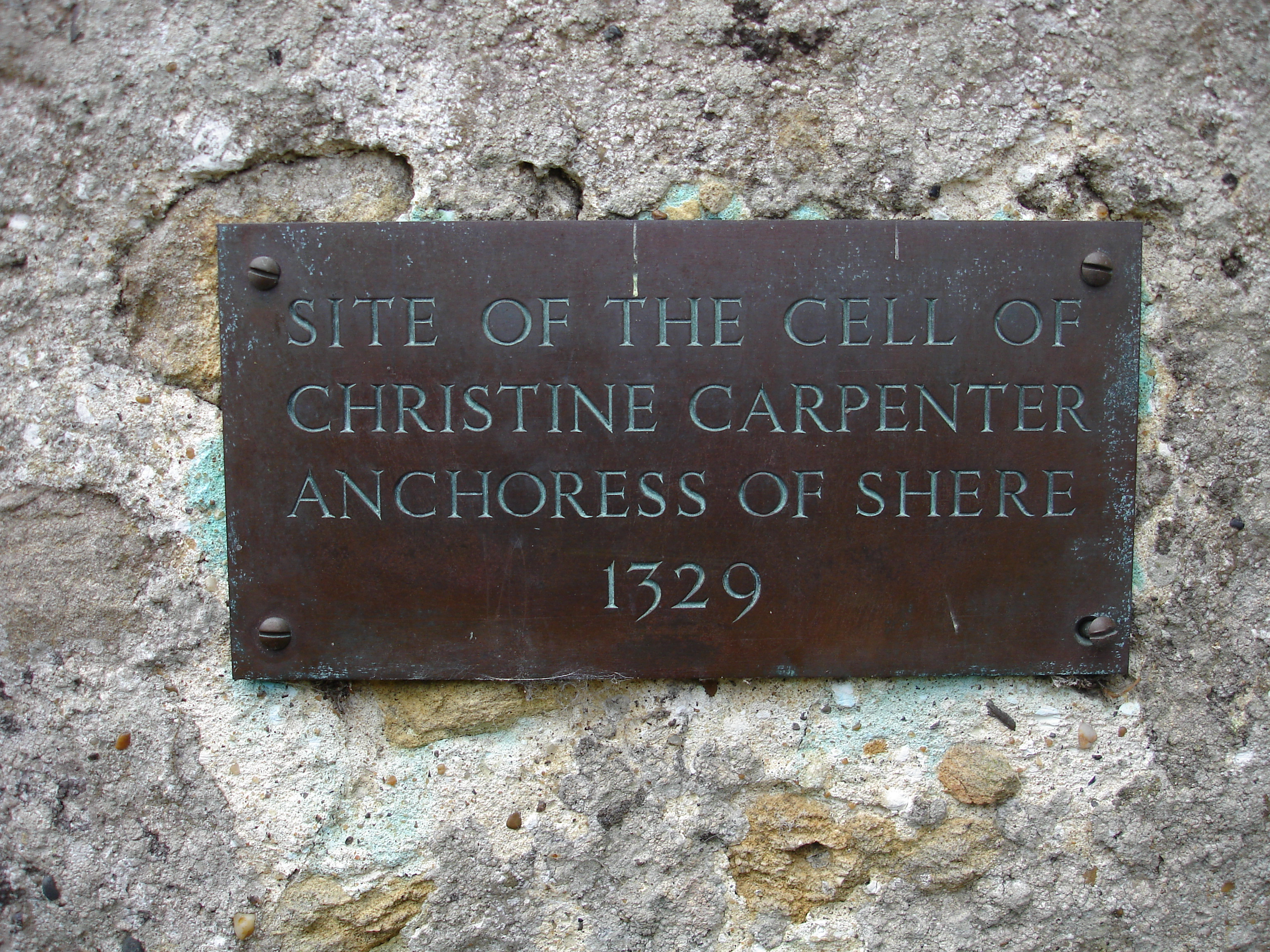
- Plaque of her cell
- Born: prob. Shere
- Died: 1300s Shere
- Other names: Christine
- Occupation: Anchoress (recluse)

Christina Carpenter or Christine Carpenter (fl. 1329–1332) was an English anchoress, also known as a religious recluse, in the village of Shere, Surrey, in southern England. She came to further notice when she left her cell which may well have been built for her in the church and wrote to the Pope to have herself readmitted.

== Life ==
Carpenter was alive in the first half of the 14th century. Her father, William, was a carpenter. On 21 June 1329, she asked permission of John de Stratford, who was then the Bishop of Winchester, to become an anchoress.

The Bishop summoned the cleric Matthew Redemane, her father and several notables to swear to her good character and virginity. Within a month, the Bishop had agreed and she was ceremoniously led to her cell on the north side of the chancel at the church in Shere. The cell had a communicating door, which was to be opened only to allow her to take communion. It is believed that this cell may have been built for her use. An anchoress was to have her hair cut every three months and wear a veil and a habit; this presumably applied to Carpenter.

By August 1332, she had left her cell, a violation of her vows. She was facing the spiritual danger of excommunication and the disappointment of all those who had spoken up for her character and integrity. Carpenter wrote to the Pope, who at the time was based in Avignon.

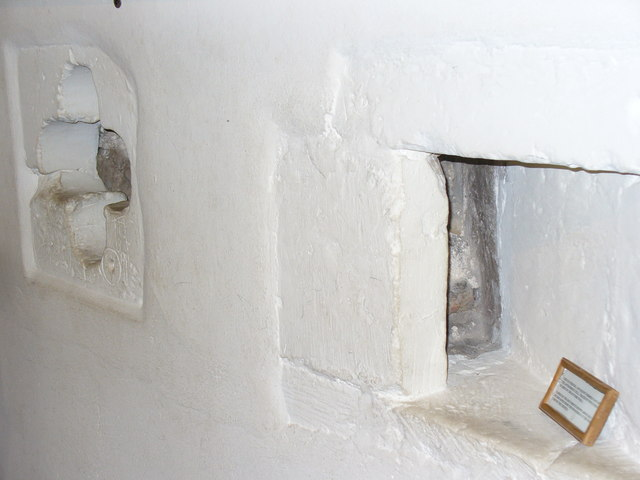
Remains of quatrefoil and squint windows

In a letter from John Wrotham in Avignon to Bishop John de Stratford, dated 6 August 1332, Wrotham records Carpenter's change of heart and her desire to re-establish her life to that of a hermit. Wrotham had been appointed a papal penitentiary by John XXII at the request of Edward II. Bishop Wrotham advocated that Christine should be forgiven and received back into her former state. However, it was agreed that she should suffer penance for her misbehaviour.

=== Second enclosure at Shere ===
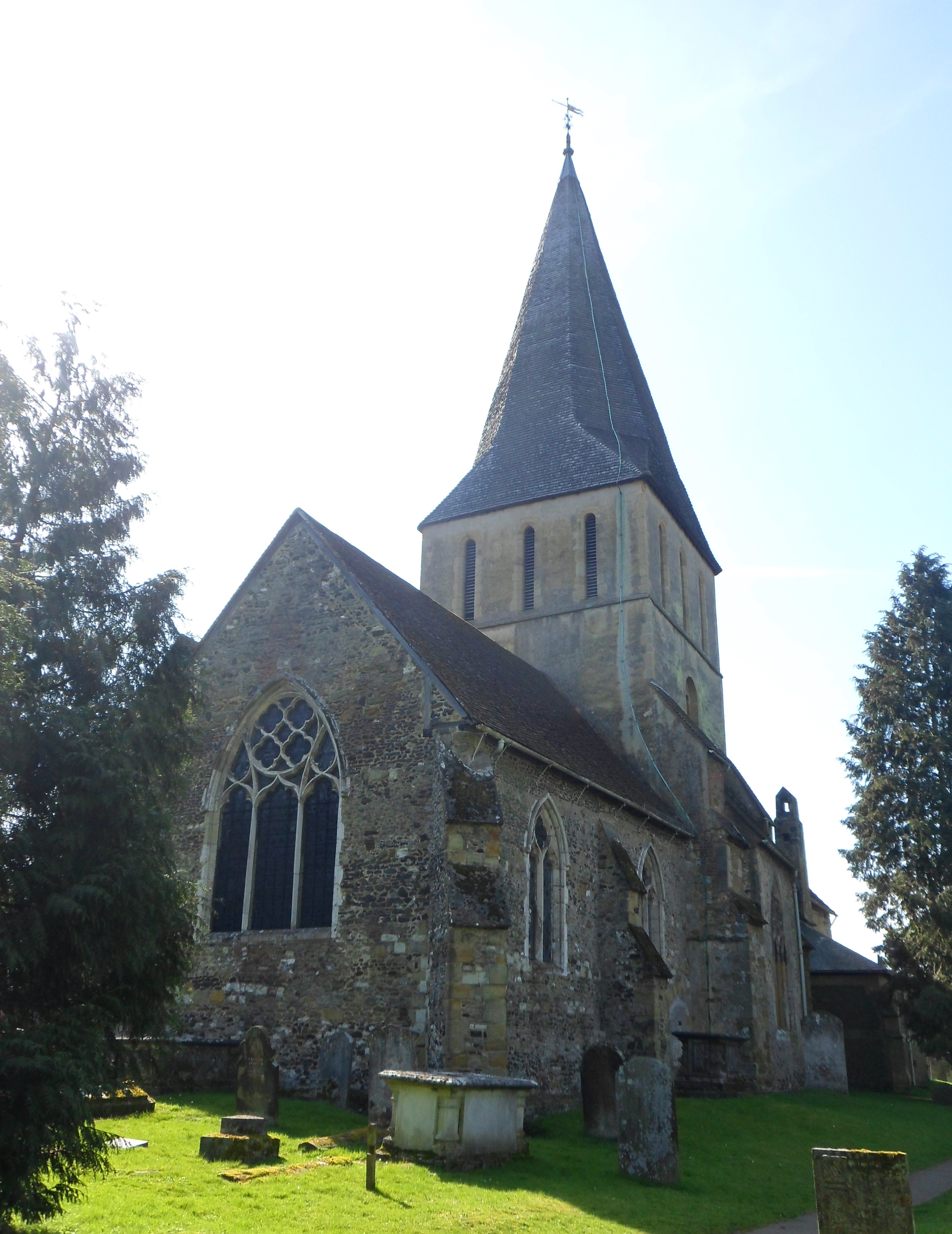
St James's church, Shere is largely 13th-century and may include Roman materials

The letters record that she should be now kept more securely and it is thought that this is the reason that the only doorway was replaced with a solid wall. The cell had two small openings into the church. The first was cruciform and it was intended to allow Carpenter to take communion. The other was a squint that allowed her to see out – but only in the direction of the church's altar. It is thought that there was a third window to the outside world, but this is no longer extant. This window would have been made too small for her to leave and its purpose would have been to allow her to be fed and watered, and for her bodily wastes to be removed. It is not known what happened to Carpenter after this date, but the usual practice was to bury anchorites where they had lived and died. After an anchoress died, her cell would have been opened and a grave would be dug under her cell.

== Death and legacy ==
Carpenter is presumed to have died in Shere. In 1333 John de Stratford became the Archbishop of Canterbury. Carpenter's story has been used as the basis for a number of pieces of literature. Sir Arnold Wesker wrote a play called Caritas based, in part, on this story. Wesker turned his play into a libretto for an opera on the same subject with music by Robert Saxton.

The 1993 movie Anchoress, directed by Chris Newby, and written by Judith Stanley-Smith and Christine Watkins, is based on the life of Christine Carpenter.

== See also ==
- Ascetical theology
- Anchorite
- Vestals (earlier, Roman parallel)
