= Anchoress (film) =

1993 British film by Chris Newby

- Directed by: Chris Newby
- Written by: Judith Stanley-Smith; Christine Watkins
- Produced by: Paul Breuls
- Starring: Natalie Morse
- Cinematography: Michel Baudour
- Edited by: Brand Thumim
- Release date: 10 September 1993
- Running time: 108 minutes
- Country: United Kingdom
- Language: English

Anchoress is a 1993 British drama film directed by Chris Newby. It was screened in the Un Certain Regard section at the 1993 Cannes Film Festival.

The screenplay is partly based on accounts of an historical female anchorite, Christine Carpenter, who was walled into her anchorhold in a village church in Shere, Surrey, in southern England, in 1329. The story revolves around the girl's mystical visions of the Virgin Mary, the local reeve who wants to marry her, and the priest who walls her into his village church and his dislike of her mother, a midwife whom he regards as a witch.

The film is shot in black-and-white and visually resembles the works of Danish filmmaker Carl Theodor Dreyer, especially The Passion of Joan of Arc (1928).

== Cast ==
- Natalie Morse as Christine Carpenter
- Gene Bervoets as Reeve (as Eugene Bervoets)
- Toyah Willcox as Pauline Carpenter
- Pete Postlethwaite as William Carpenter
- Christopher Eccleston as Priest
- Michael Pas as Drover
- Brenda Bertin as Meg Carpenter
- Annette Badland as Mary
- Veronica Quilligan as Daisy
- Julie T. Wallace as Bertha
- Ann Way as Alice
- François Beukelaers as Bishop
- Jan Decleir as Mason
- David Boyce as Ragged Martin
- Mieke De Groote as Ragged Martin's wife
- Erik Konstantyn as Carter
- Hugo Harold Harrison as Priest's boy
- Corinne Michel as Pilgrim

== Year-end lists ==
- Honorable mention – Howie Movshovitz, The Denver Post

== See also ==
- List of historical drama films
