= Gomshall =

Village in Surrey, England

Coordinates: 51°13′16″N 0°26′53″W

- Village
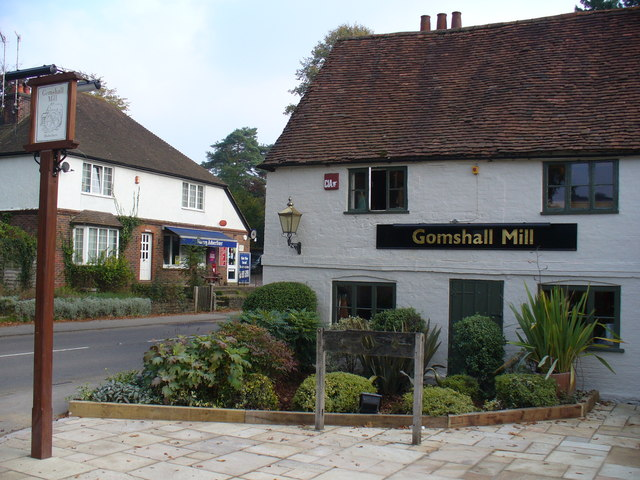
- Gomshall Post Office and Mill

- Location within Surrey
- Population: <1,000
- OS grid reference: TQ084480
- Civil parish: Shere
- District: Guildford
- Shire county: Surrey
- Region: South East
- Country: England
- Sovereign state: United Kingdom
- Post town: Guildford
- Postcode district: GU5
- Dialling code: 01483
- Police: Surrey
- Fire: Surrey
- Ambulance: South East Coast
- UK Parliament: Godalming and Ash

Gomshall is a village in the borough of Guildford in Surrey, England.

It is on the A25, roughly halfway between Guildford and Dorking, and in Shere civil parish, which, reaching to Peaslake and Colmar's Hill, in 2001 recorded a human population of 3,359. Nearest places are Shere, Albury and Abinger Hammer.

The River Tillingbourne flows through Gomshall, while the North Downs Way passes just to the north. The village also has a railway station on the North Downs Line, served by Great Western Railway trains running between Reading and Redhill.

== History ==
The Manor of Gumesele was a Saxon feudal landholding that originally included the present-day Gomshall.

Gomshall appears in the Domesday Book of 1086 as Gomeselle. It was held by William the Conqueror. Its Domesday assets were: 1 mill worth 3s 4d, 20 ploughs, 3 acres (12,000 m^{2}) of meadow, woodland worth 30 hogs. It rendered £30.

In 1154, Henry II of England divided the Manor of Gumesele into three: West Gomshall, East Gomshall and Somersbury. In 1240, West Gomshall was granted to the Cistercian Abbey of Netley in Hampshire and became known as Gomshall Netley. In 1376 East Gomshall was granted to the Abbey of St Mary Graces, Tower Hill, London, and became known as Gomshall Towerhill.

For the 1380 poll tax, Gomshall had 267 names registered. The occupations written beside the names show land-holders and the usual country crafts but also a high proportion of skills relating to the wool trade; there were spinners and weavers, fullers and pelterers and many tailors.

Local industries developed based on the plentiful and constant water supply of the River Tillingbourne. Those that survived into the 20th century, but are now gone, were corn milling, watercress growing, and leather tanning. Gomshall Mill, now a public house, was the corn mill. Netley Mill pumped water for the Hurtwood Water Company for part of its existence.

== Amenities ==
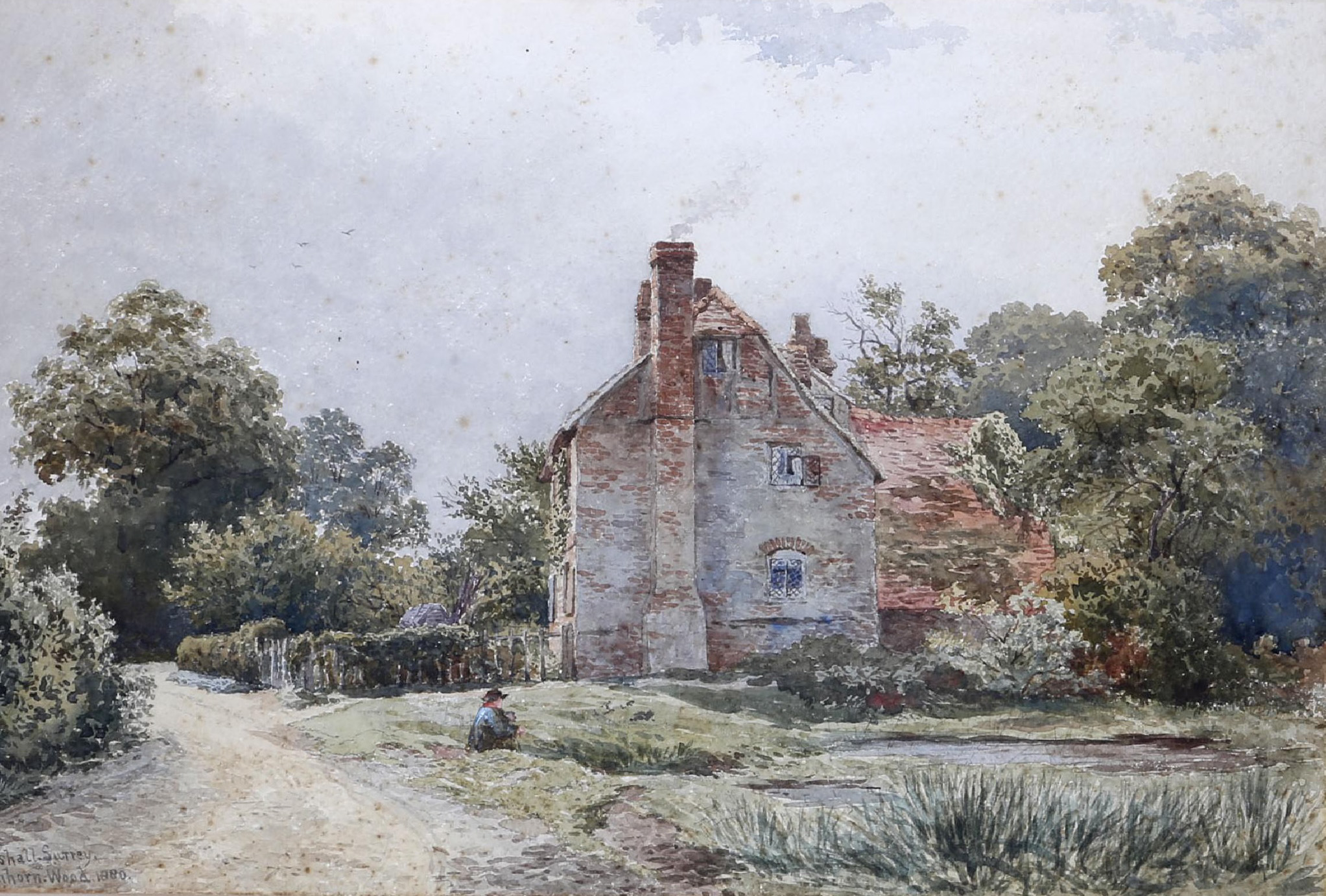
Towerhill Manor, as portrayed by Lewis Pinhorn Wood in 1880, was bought by Sir Edward Bray of Vachery in 1550 and remained in the Bray family until 1972.

Gomshall has two pubs, a petrol station and a number of homeware shops. Although the petrol station has a very small shop the nearest everyday shops are either in Shere or Abinger Hammer.

Gomshall Mill pub reopened in December 2022 following the completion of the first phase of a major refurbishment project. The building, which dates from the 17th century, was a watermill until 1953 and the waterwheel can still be seen inside. The Compasses Inn nearby, has a garden by the Tillingbourne stream.

The Vintage Frog and Coachhouse sell homeware and the latter has a garden that backs onto the Tillingbourne stream.

The old Black Horse pub operated as a cafe and homewares shop in recent years, most recently as the Lavender Goose. Originally a malt house in the late 17th century, it did not become a pub until the early 19th century. John Reffell's brewery used to be situated at the back of the inn, and brewed mild, bitter and a Farmer's Brew here. William Gladstone is said to have had a meeting here. Young's of Wandsworth bought the pub in 1926 and closed the brewery three years later. The pub was a country hotel up until its sale to Whitbread in 1989, who then ran it as a Mulligans fish restaurant. It returned to being a pub, and featured both Thai and Indian restaurants. However the pub closed again in 2008 and following a long period of uncertainty opened as a tea room in October 2011. The site ceased trading over the pandemic and was sold in 2021 and purchased by a developer for housing. The completed scheme saw the building demolished and replaced with blocks of flats and townhouses.

== See also ==
- List of places of worship in the Borough of Guildford
