= Anchorite =

Christian ascetic

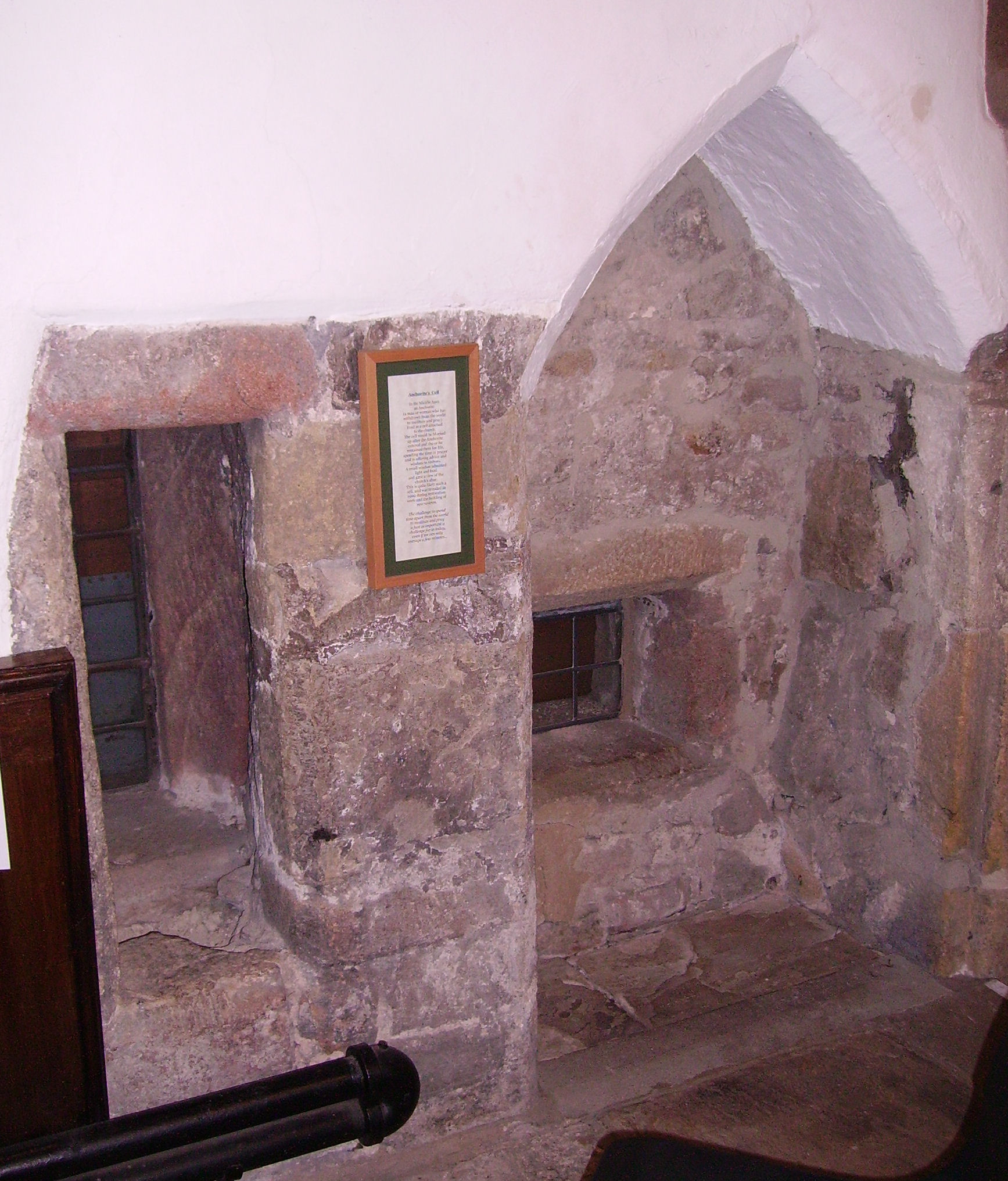
An anchorite's cell in Holy Trinity Church, Skipton

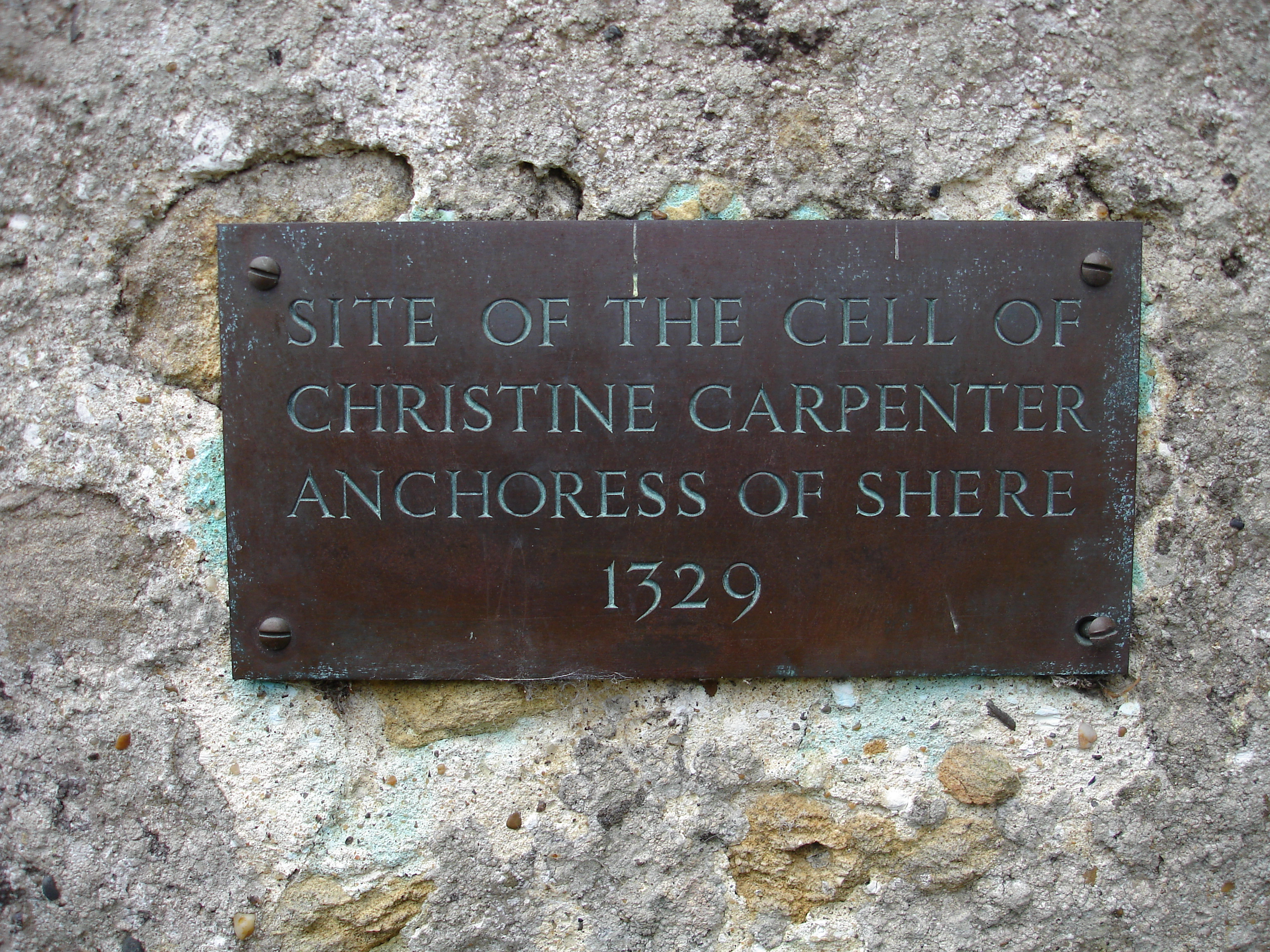
Christine Carpenter was walled in to a cell in St James's Church in Shere, Surrey.

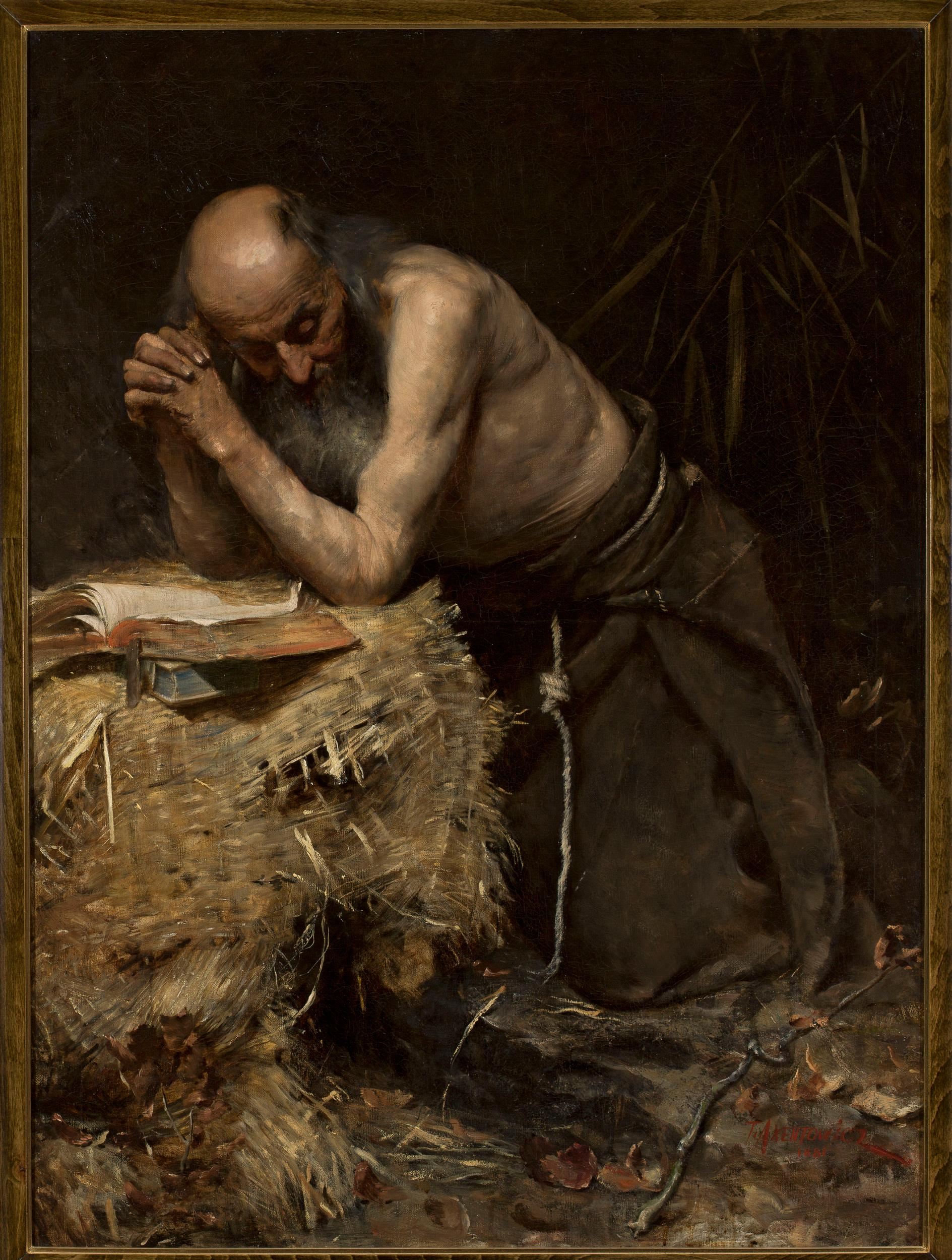
The Anchorite (1881), by Teodor Axentowicz

In Christianity, an anchorite or anchoret (female: anchoress) is someone who, for religious reasons, withdraws from secular society to be able to lead an intensely prayer-oriented, ascetic, or Eucharist-focused life. Anchorites are frequently considered to be a type of hermit, but unlike hermits, they were required to take a vow of stability of place, opting for permanent enclosure in cells often attached to churches. Also unlike hermits, anchorites were subject to a religious rite of consecration that closely resembled the funeral rite, following which they would be considered dead to the world and a type of living saint. Anchorites had a certain autonomy, as they did not answer to any ecclesiastical authority apart from bishops.

The anchoritic life is one of the earliest forms of Christian monasticism. In Catholicism and Evangelical Lutheranism, heremitic life is one of the forms of consecrated life. In medieval England, the earliest recorded anchorites lived in the 11th century. Their highest number—around 200 anchorites—was recorded in the 13th century.

From the 12th to the 16th centuries, female anchorites consistently outnumbered their male counterparts, sometimes by as many as four to one in the 13th century. This ratio eventually dropped to two to one in the 15th century. The sex of a high number of anchorites, however, is not recorded for these periods.

Between 1536 and 1539, the dissolution of the monasteries ordered by Henry VIII of England effectively brought the anchorite tradition to an end in England.

== Anchoritic life ==
The anchoritic life became widespread during the early and high Middle Ages. Examples of the dwellings of anchorites and anchoresses survive, a large number of which are in England. They tended to be a simple cell (also called anchorhold) built against one of the walls of the local village church.

In Germanic-speaking areas, from at least the tenth century it was customary for the bishop to say the Office of the Dead as the anchorite entered their cell, to signify the anchorite's death to the world and rebirth to a spiritual life of solitary communion with God and the angels. Sometimes, if the anchorite was walled up inside the cell, the bishop would put his seal upon the wall to stamp it with his authority. Some anchorites, however, freely moved between their cells and the adjoining churches.

Most anchorholds were small, perhaps at most 3.7 to 4.6 m (12 to 15 ft) square, with three windows. Viewing the altar, hearing Mass, and receiving the Eucharist were possible through one small, shuttered window in the common wall facing the sanctuary, called a "hagioscope" or "squint". Anchorites provided spiritual advice and counsel to visitors through these windows, gaining a reputation for wisdom. Another small window allowed access to those who saw to the anchorite's physical needs. A third window, often facing the street but covered with translucent cloth, allowed light into the cell.

Anchorites committed to a life of uncompromising enclosure. Those who considered leaving possibly believed their souls might be damned for spiritual dereliction. (Note: "The cell of enclosure, however, was equated with a prison, into which the anchorite propelled himself for fear of hell and for love of Christ. The eternal punishment of hell might be escaped by the lifetime refusal of escape from the anchorhold. At the same time, union with Christ might be achieved even in this life." — A. K. Warren (1985)) Some refused to leave their cells even when pirates or looters were pillaging their towns and consequently burned to death when the church was torched. They ate frugal meals, spending their days both in contemplative prayer and interceding on behalf of others. Their body waste was managed using a chamber pot.

Some anchorholds had a few small rooms or attached gardens. Servants tended to the basic needs of anchorites, providing food and water and removing waste. Julian of Norwich, for example, is known to have had several maidservants, among them Sara and Alice. Aelred of Rievaulx wrote an anchorite rule book, c. 1161, for his recluse sister titled De Institutione Inclusarum. In it, he suggested keeping no housemates other than an older woman, to act as companion and doorkeeper, and a young maid as domestic servant.

The anchorhold was the physical location wherein the anchorite could embark on a journey toward union with God. It also provided a spiritual and geographic focus for people from the wider society seeking spiritual advice and guidance. Though set apart from the community by stone walls and specific spiritual precepts, the anchorite lay at the very centre of the community. The anchorhold has been called a communal "womb" from which would emerge an idealised sense of a community's reborn potential as Christians and as human subjects.

== Influential texts ==
An idea of their daily routine can be gleaned from an anchoritic rule. The most widely known today is the early 13th-century text known as Ancrene Wisse. Another, less widely known, example is the rule known as De Institutione Inclusarum written in the 12th century, around 1160–1162, by Aelred of Rievaulx for his sister. It is estimated that the daily set devotions detailed in Ancrene Wisse would take some four hours, on top of which anchoresses would listen to services in the church and engage in their own private prayers and devotional reading.

Richard Rolle, an English hermit and mystic, wrote one of the most influential guide books regarding the life of an anchoress. His book The Form of Living was addressed to a young anchoress named Margaret Kirkby who was responsible for preserving his texts. Her connection to the town of Hampole has been commonly associated with Rolle. He is sometimes referred to as 'Richard Rolle of Hampole' despite a lack of conclusive evidence that Rolle was ever in the small village.

== Notable anchorites ==
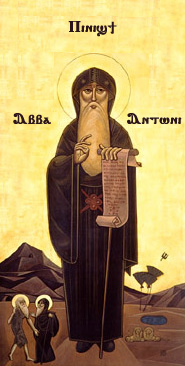
Anthony the Great, father of Christian Monasticism and early anchorite. The Coptic inscription reads 'Ⲡⲓⲛⲓϣϯ Ⲁⲃⲃⲁ Ⲁⲛⲧⲱⲛⲓ' or 'The Great Father Anthony'.

The earliest recorded anchorites lived in the third century AD. Saint Anthony the Anchorite (251–356), also known as "Anthony of the Desert", has a traditional reputation as Christianity's "Father of Monasticism". Hilarion (Gaza, 291 – Cyprus, 371) was known as the founder of anchoritic life in Palestine.

The anchoritic life proved popular in England, where women outnumbered men in the ranks of the anchorites, especially in the 13th century. Written evidence supports the existence of 780 anchorites on 600 sites between 1100 and 1539, when the Dissolution of the Monasteries ordered by Henry VIII brought anchoritism in England to an end. However, the lack of a consistent registration system for anchorites suggests there may have been substantially more. English anchorholds can still be seen at Chester-le-Street in County Durham and at Hartlip in Kent.

- Bede records that prior to a conference in 602 with Augustine of Canterbury, British churchmen consulted an anchorite about whether to abandon their Celtic Christian traditions for the Roman practices which Augustine was seeking to introduce.
- Toward the end of the seventh century, Guthlac of Crowland, related to the royal family of Mercia, withdrew from the monastery at Repton to an island in the Lincolnshire Fens where he lived for some 15–20 years.
- Eve of Wilton (died c. 1125) was an English anchoress.
- Wulfric of Haselbury (died 1154) was enclosed as an anchorite in a cell built against the church in his village of Haselbury Plucknett in Somerset.
- Christine Carpenter, who submitted a petition in 1329 and was granted permission to become the anchoress of Shere Church, also known as the Church of St. James, in the Borough of Guildford, received her food and drink through a metal grating on the outside wall. In the interior of the church, a quatrefoil through which she could receive the Eucharist and a hagioscope for her use for prayer and reflection were cut out of the wall. Although she left her cell, in 1332 she applied for—and was granted—permission to be re-enclosed.
- Katherine of Ledbury, anchorite at Ledbury, Herefordshire, in the early 14th century.
- Margaret Kirkby (possibly 1322 to c. 1391–1394), an anchoress at Hampole, for whom Richard Rolle wrote his vernacular guide The Form of Living.
- In 1346, an unnamed anchorite scribe translated Latin texts into Welsh, producing what is today known as Book of the Anchorite of Llanddewibrefi.
- Walter Hilton (c. 1340/1345 – 1396) composed the first book of his Scale of Perfection for an unnamed enclosed woman.
- Julian of Norwich (died after 1416) wrote the mystic text Revelations of Divine Love, which made a permanent contribution to Christian spirituality. Her cell, attached to St Julian's Church, Norwich, was destroyed during the Dissolution, and the church itself was gutted by bombing in the Second World War, but afterwards rebuilt. On the site of the cell is a modern shrine to Julian.
- Patrick Begley (or Beglin) was an Irish anchorite who lived in a cell at Fore Abbey in the 17th century.
- Nazarena of Jesus was an American who felt called to become an anchorite and entered the Camaldolese Abbey of Sant'Antimo in Rome in 1945, remaining there until her death in 1990.

Other anchorites included Calogerus the Anchorite (c. 466 – 561), Cyriacus the Anchorite (448–557) and Suster Bertken (1426–1514).

== In popular culture ==
- Arnold Wesker's 1981 play Caritas dramatizes the historical figure of Christine Carpenter, a 14th-century teenager who voluntarily underwent immurement as an anchoress to seek spiritual purity.
- Robyn Cadwallader's historical novel The Anchoress gives a fictional account of a young woman serving as an anchoress in 13th-century England.
- The main character of the kinetic novel Misericorde: Volume One, Hedwig, serves as an anchoress for twenty years in 15th-century England. Its sequel, Misericorde: Volume Two, also has Hedwig as the protagonist.
- Janet Rich Edwards' historical novel Canticle describes a young woman who serves as an anchoress in 13th-century Brugge.
- The novel I, Julian by Claire Gilbert (2023) fictionalises the life of Julian of Norwich (see above).

== See also ==
- Ancrene Wisse
- Book of the First Monks
- Cenobitic monasticism
- Christian mysticism
- Enclosed religious orders
- Immured anchorite
- Sadhu
- Stylite

== General and cited references ==
- "About Anchorites". Hermits & Anchorites of England, University of Exeter, 2010.
- The Editors of Encyclopædia Britannica. "Great Chain of Being". Encyclopædia Britannica, Encyclopædia Britannica, Inc., 27 May 2015.
- Dixon, Alan. "The 'Great Chain of Being'". Inner Civilization, 1 Jan. 1970.
- Licence, Tom (2013). Hermits and Recluses in English Society, 950–1200. OUP Oxford. ISBN 978-0-19-967409-1.
- McAvoy, Liz (2010). Anchoritic Traditions of Medieval Europe. Boydell & Brewer. ISBN 978-1-84383-520-2.
- "Richard Rolle's Form of Living: A Medieval Guide for an Anchoress". Hermitary – the hermit, hermits, eremitism, solitude, silence, and simplicity, 2006.
