= Shere =

Village and parish in Surrey, England

Coordinates: 51°13′14″N 0°28′07″W

- Village
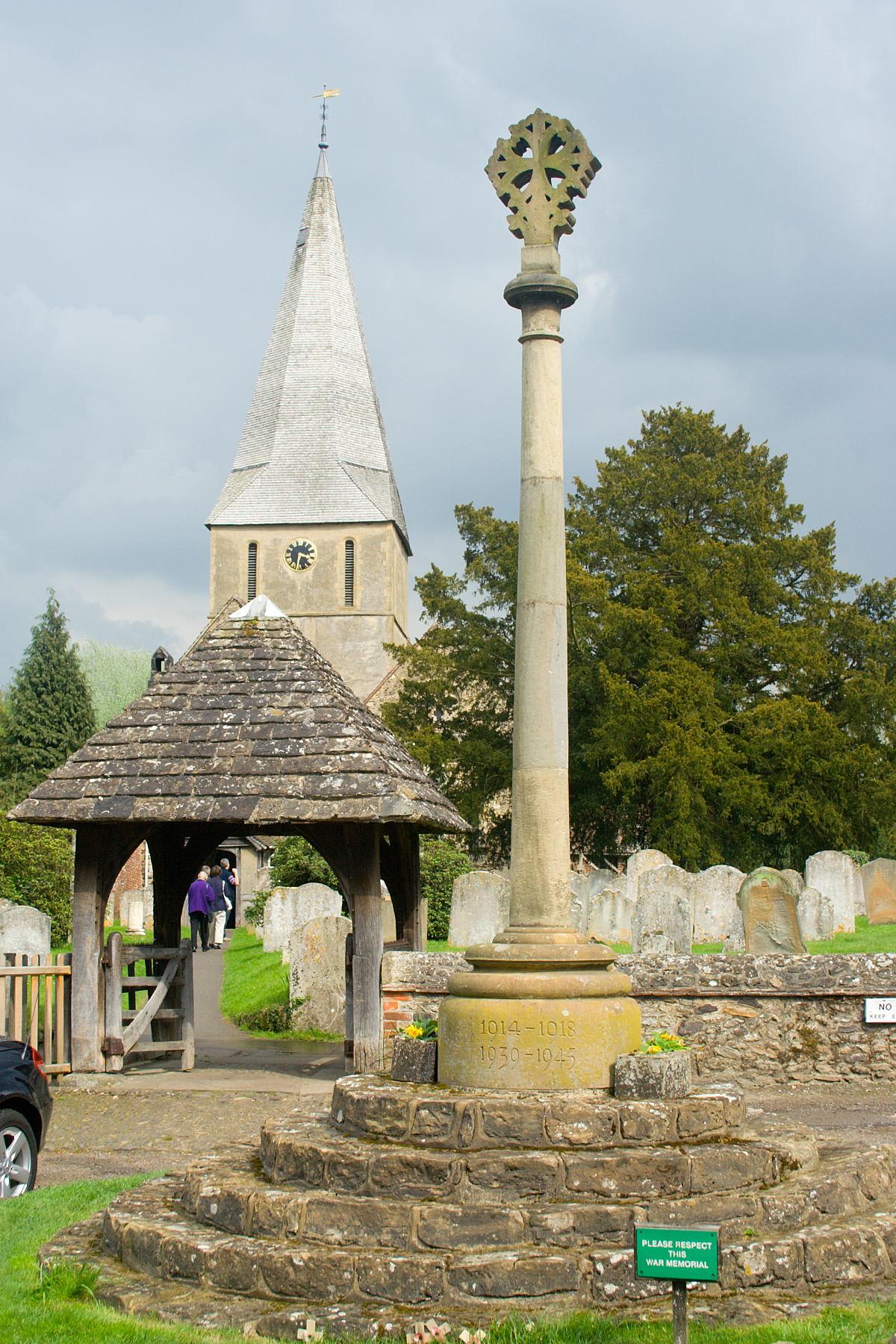
- St James' Church

- Location within Surrey
- Area: 9.88 km^{2} (3.81 sq mi)
- Population: 1,032 (2011)(relevant part of Civil Parish, whole parish had 3,630 people over 24.5 km^{2})
  - Density: 104/km^{2} (270/sq mi)
- OS grid reference: TQ070479
- Civil parish: Shere
- District: Guildford
- Shire county: Surrey
- Region: South East
- Country: England
- Sovereign state: United Kingdom
- Post town: Guildford
- Postcode district: GU5
- Dialling code: 01483
- Police: Surrey
- Fire: Surrey
- Ambulance: South East Coast
- UK Parliament: Godalming and Ash

Shere is a village in the Guildford district of Surrey, England 4.8 miles (7.7 km) east south-east of Guildford and 5.4 miles (8.7 km) west of Dorking, centrally bypassed by the A25. Located on the River Tillingbourne it is a small still partly agricultural village chiefly set in the wooded Vale of Holmesdale between the North Downs and Greensand Ridge. As of 2011 the village had a population of 1,032.

The village gives its name to the larger civil parish of Shere, extending to the east and south into hamlets founded in the early Middle Ages which officially, in the 19th century, were consolidated into three villages; Gomshall, Holmbury St. Mary and Peaslake. This larger entity has a total population of 3,359 and area of 24.5 square kilometres (9.5 sq mi) (as at the 2011 census).

== History ==
=== Domesday book and manors ===
Shere appears in Domesday Book as Essira and Essire in the ancient hundred of Blackheath. It was held by William the Conqueror. Its Domesday assets were: 1 church, 2 mills worth 10s per year, 14 ploughs, 3 acres (1.2 ha) of meadow, woodland worth 50 hogs. It rendered £15 per year to its overlords.

In 1086, when Gomshall was royal demesne, the villeins (villagers) there were exempt from the sheriff's jurisdiction; Gomshall Netley and Gomshall Towerhill manors had court baron. Eleanor, Countess of Ormond owning the Vachery manor, had view of frankpledge in Gomshall Towerhill. In 1281 William Braose was granted free warren there

In the 13th century Roger de Clare settled for a life-rent on the church and sold the manor of Shere to a grandson of Geoffrey Fitz Peter, 1st Earl of Essex. In turn his grandson divided the manor, according with the law of moiety title to his daughter Joan Butler who thus received the new manor of Shiere Vachery; while Richard Óg de Burgh, 2nd Earl of Ulster ('the red Earl') received Shiere Ebor(acum). Two other manors evolved.

Highlights of the often influential tapestry of powerful owners include (but are not limited to):

Powerful or nationally significant lords of the four manors
Shiere Vachery or Shere Vachery	Shiere Ebor or Shere Eboracum	Gomshall Netley	Towerhil
James Butler, 1st Earl of Ormond	William Donn de Burgh, 3rd Earl of Ulster	Netley Abbey	William de Braose
James Butler, 3rd Earl of Ormond ('the noble Earl')	Philippa, 5th Countess of Ulster	Sir Edward Bray MP (Tudor)	Rowland de Bloet
James Butler, 4th Earl of Ormond ('the white Earl')	Roger Mortimer, 4th Earl of March and daughter Anne de Mortimer		Eastminster (or St Mary Graces) Abbey, by Tower Hill (reversion accruing ground rent then full agricultural rent) 1350–1538
James Butler, 5th Earl of Ormond (Earl of Wiltshire)	Richard of York, 3rd Duke of York and his widow Cecily Neville, Duchess of York		
Sir Reginald Bray (political advisor to Henry VII of England and statesman) to tenant: James Tuchet, 7th Baron Audley	Henry VIII as dower property for wives until Katherine Howard hence alternative name, the Queens Hold		
Sir Edmund Bray MP	Edmund Tylney, Master of the Revels (or Queen's Revels)		
Edward Braye MP			

=== Medieval to 19th century ===
The Victoria County History (Surrey: 1911) cites numerous mentions in the Assize Rolls, Patent Rolls, Feet of Fines and the ecclesiastical records of Westminster and Lambeth Palaces. Traditionally the parish included the areas of the current civil parish and measured about 4 1/2 miles from north to south, and from 2 to 2 1/2 miles from east to west and contained 6,400 acres of land and 12 of water.

The neighbourhood was for a time one of the wildest in Surrey: sheep-stealers, smugglers, and poachers found a refuge in these remote hills. Some of the cottages have, still existing, very large cellars (excavated easily in the sandy hill), stated by H.E. Malden to have been "far too large for any honest purpose, and were no doubt made for storing smuggled goods till they could be conveniently taken on to London".

In 1671, a Shere man called Edward Bound was charged by church authorities with "playing cricket on the Sabbath" and was exonerated, one of the sport's earliest references.

Iron was worked from the stone and into implements in centuries before the 18th century in Shere. In 1911 great quantities of watercress were grown which is no longer the case; the principal area in southern England for this being near New Alresford in Hampshire.

=== 19th century ===
Holmbury St. Mary up in the Greensand Ridge was a modern village term devised in 1878 for the two hamlets of Felday in Shere and Pitland Street in Shere and Abinger, when the place became a civil parish and ecclesiastical parish. The Church of England schools were built in 1860 and enlarged in 1900.

== School ==
Shere Infant and Nursery School has been serving the local community since 1852, celebrating its 175th birthday in 2017. The school received a 'Good' status from the Ofsted inspection in December 2015.

== Landmarks ==
=== St James' Church ===
The church of St James is in the Early English style, most being 12th, 13th and 14th century. It replaced an earlier Anglo-Saxon church mentioned in the Domesday Book. Constructed of ironstone rubble with sandstone buttresses, it was restored in 1895 by S. Weatherley. By the north chancel wall there is a 14th-century quatrefoil window and squint – belonging to an Anchorite cell used by Christina Carpenter in the 14th-century. There is 14th-century glass in the east window and the chancel fittings were renewed in 1956 by Louis Osman. It is a Grade I listed building.

=== Other Listed Buildings ===
Within the village centre conservation area there are 34 listed buildings.

These are all older than 1830, in some cases by several centuries.

== Transport ==
The village can be accessed for long-distance travel from the north and west from the A3 at West Clandon – from the east the M25 at Leatherhead and the A24 at Dorking followed by the A25 road provides a shorter alternative route than taking the first route; there are minor routes south however the nearest major route directly south is the A24 at Dorking.

Gomshall railway station is less than 1 mile (1.6 km) away on the Reading to Gatwick line. While 1614 people (65% of the parish) in 2001 for instance were economically active, only 178 routinely used public transport and 1037 used motor vehicles. The average Shere commuter travels 20.3 kilometres (12.6 mi) to work.

== Economy, demography and housing ==
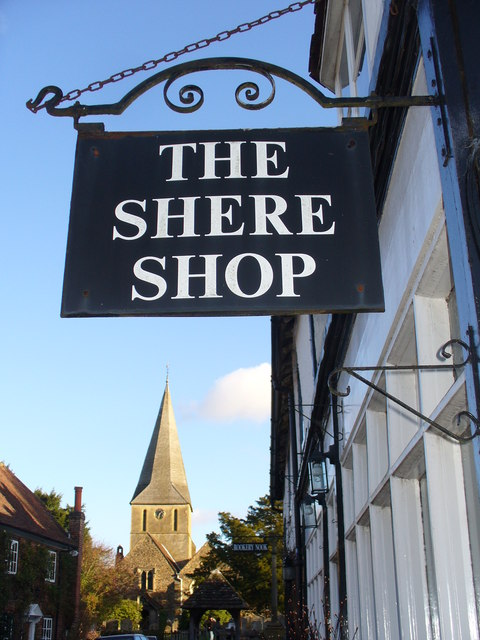
Shere Shop sign

The economy is a mixture of local and regional with the many shops and some farming within it. A significant minority of the working population are London commuters, particularly in the civil parish at large. The 2001 census shows the self-employed (including with employees) form 36% of the population, retirees form 16% of the population and employees form 48% of the population. 77% of the ward's population is Christian, of the remainder 22% are of no religion or not stated.

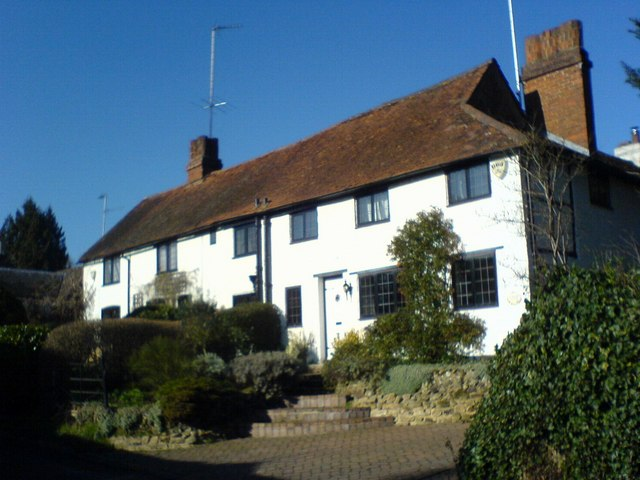
Burdens

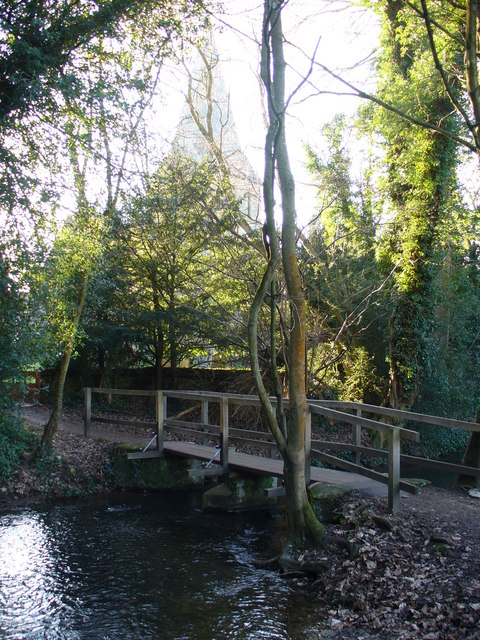
Footbridge by streamside village centre footpath

Within the civil parish are shops, four village halls, and three post offices. Many walks radiate from the village, including a streamside walk, parts of the North Downs Way and the Pilgrims' Way. In the village are Millstream Press, a book publisher named after the Tillingbourne, a textiles-cum-boutique and Surrey Hills Brewery.

The 2011 United Kingdom census classified the village as four relevant output layers, approximately a third of the ward Shere, the latter being used for elections to Guildford Borough Council. All parts featured their single largest proportion of housing as either semi-detached or single-family homes and most of these with gardens.

In all 439 households (in slightly fewer homes) make up the village including its scattered farms and cottages. The census boundaries drawn exclude central and eastern Burrows Cross due to is proximity to slightly larger hamlet Gomshall, being contiguous and due south Burrows Cross had census overlap of its output areas (E00155528 and E00155529) and was included within Gomshall.

The proportion of households in three divisions of Shere who owned their home outright was at least 5% above the national average, in the fourth division this was 3% below, a central area including one of the two conservation area thoroughfares. The proportion of residents who owned their home with a loan was between 2.8% and 11.3% lower than the national average. The census shows that overall, Shere has a lower proportion than average of rented residential property and of social housing relative to the Surrey and national averages.

2011 Census Key Statistics
Output area	Population	Households	% Owned outright	% Owned with a loan	hectares
E00155527	220	100	39.0	30.0	165
E00155526	329	144	35.4	23.6	87
E00155525	142	51	51.0	23.5	677
E00155524	341	144	27.1	21.5	59

Across the whole parish the 2011 distribution of housing was:

2011 Census Homes
Output area	Detached	Semi-detached	Terraced	Flats and apartments	Caravans/temporary/mobile homes	shared between households
(Civil Parish)	745	477	146	103	4	0

The average level of accommodation in the region composed of detached houses was 28%, the average that was apartments was 22.6%.

== Local government ==
At Surrey County Council, one of the 81 representatives represents the area within the Shere division which includes Albury and (East and West) Clandon.

At Guildford Borough Council most wards of the borough are deemed appropriate to be represented under the current constitution of councillors by two to three councillors, which is the case for the Tillingbourne ward which has two.

Guildford Borough Councillors
Election	Member	Ward
2015	Richard Billington (Conservative)	Tillingbourne
2019	Diana Jones (Green Party)	Tillingbourne

Surrey County Councillor
Election	Member	Electoral Division
2017	Keith Taylor (Conservative)	Shere

== Notable residents ==
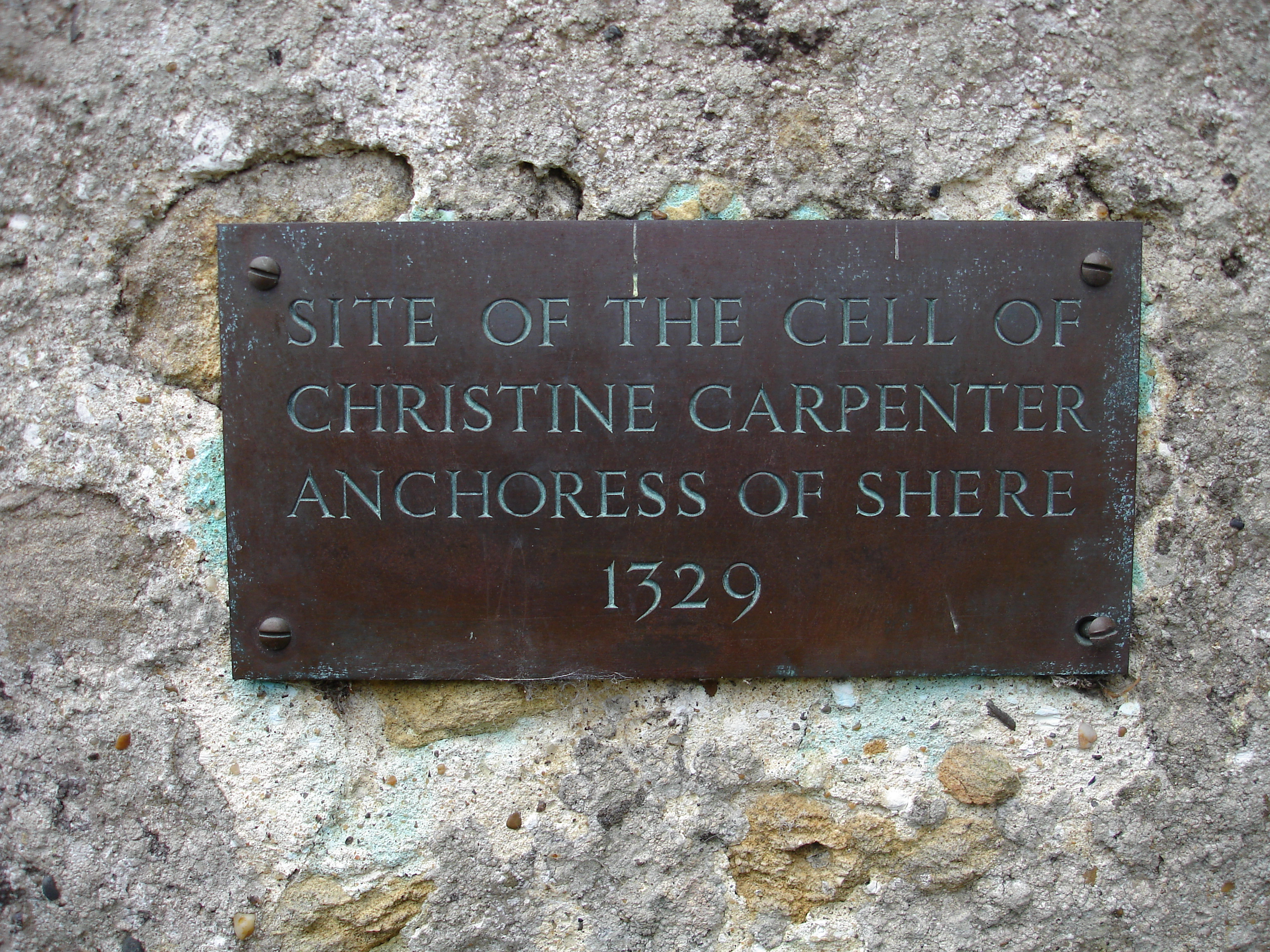
Anchoress of Shere

- Christine Carpenter (of unknown year of birth and death) submitted a petition in 1329 and consequently was granted permission to become the Anchoress of Shere Church (aka. The Church of St. James). She received her food and drink from friends and family through a metal grating on the outside wall. In the interior of the church a quatrefoil shape was cut out of the wall through which she could receive the Eucharist and a squint (or hagioscope) for her use for prayer and reflection. She left her cell and in 1332 she applied again and was granted permission to be re-enclosed.
- Benjamin Williams Leader (1831–1923), landscape artist. Lived in the parish from 1889 to 1923 at Burrows Cross, a large mansion which dominated its hamlet directly south-east of the village, designed by Norman Shaw.
- Lewis Pinhorn Wood (1848–1918), landscapist and watercolourist, best known for his rural scenes of Sussex and Surrey. In the tradition of the Victorian era, his work depicted idyllic scenes of rural life across the home counties. He lived with his family in the parish in the 1870s and 1880s at 'Burnside'.
- Harry Edwards (1893–1976), spiritual healer, founded his "Spiritual Healing sanctuary" at Burrows Lea, a house in the east of the parish, in 1946; he went on to found the "National Federation of Spiritual Healers" (NFSH) in 1959.
- John "Hoppy" Hopgood (1921–1943), a pilot with 617 Squadron, the Dambusters. Flying as Guy Gibson's second in command, he was killed in the attack on the Möhne dam. "Hoppy" lived in Hurstcote House on Hook Lane which is now the site of Shere Court.

== In popular culture ==
=== Film location ===
Since at least the early 20th century, the location and Tudor architecture has been a draw for artists and film-makers. The Victoria County History, which was written for the county of Surrey in 1911, lavished more praise than on any other village:

Shere has often been called one of the most beautiful villages in England; certainly few can surpass it in Surrey for a combination of those qualities that go to make up the ideal village... Shere is, therefore, the haunt of painters, many of them residents in and around, and samples of their handiwork may be inspected in the ancient Black Horse Inn.

Films made in the area include:

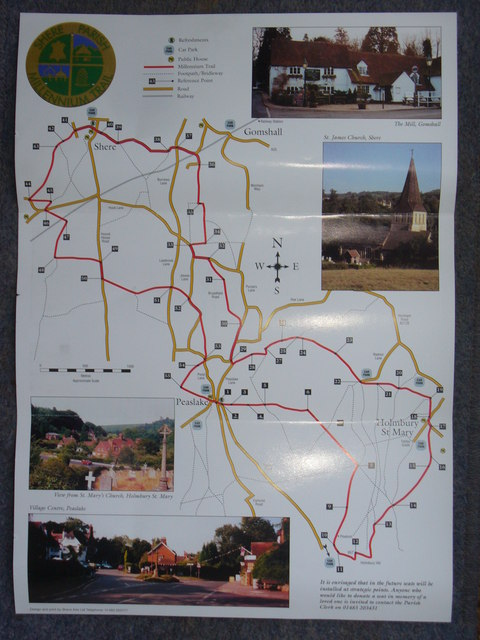
Shere parish millennium trail

- 1918, D. W. Griffith's silent film Hearts of the World.
- 1946, as Dr. Reeves' village in Michael Powell and Emeric Pressburger's A Matter of Life and Death.
- 1964, The Earth Dies Screaming, a science fiction film directed by Terence Fisher.
- 1965, Die, Monster, Die!, loosely based on H. P. Lovecraft's The Colour Out of Space, starring Boris Karloff.
- 1972, The Ruling Class, starring Peter O'Toole.
- 2004, Bridget Jones: The Edge of Reason, in which St James's church features briefly in the final wedding scene.
- 2005, The Wedding Date starring Debra Messing and Dermot Mulroney.
- 2006, The Holiday starring Cameron Diaz, Kate Winslet and Jude Law.
- 2021, The music video for Zombie! by Orla Gartland.

=== In literature ===
Anchoress of Shere by Paul L. Moorcraft.

The Passionate Friends, a social commentary novel by H. G. Wells, places the protagonist's marriage here.

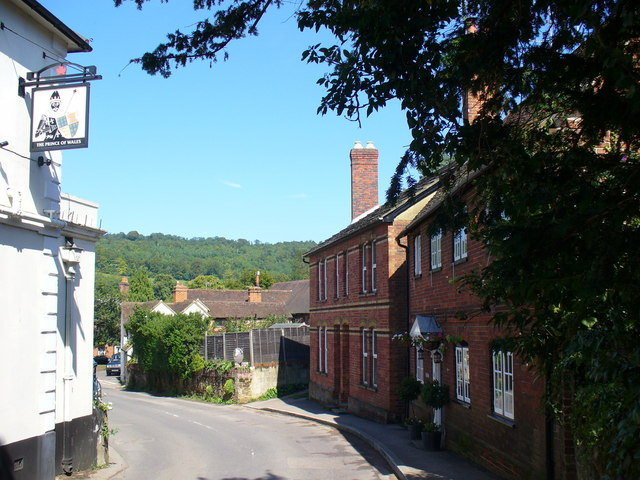
Shere Lane, one of four relatively narrow streets

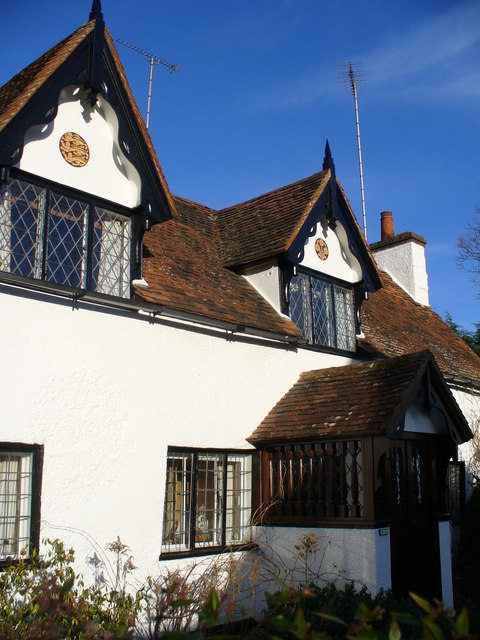
Listed building
