= Robyn Cadwallader =

Australian writer

- Occupation: Novelist
- Writing career
- Notable awards: 2018 Canberra Critics Circle Awards — Fiction, winner

Robyn Cadwallader is an Australian writer of novels, short stories and poetry.

In 2015 her debut historical fiction novel, The Anchoress, was published. For this novel, she was shortlisted for the 2015 Adelaide Festival Awards for Literature.

Cadwallader graduated from Monash University and has a PhD in medieval literature from Flinders University. She developed her 2002 thesis, The virgin, the dragon and the theorist : readings in the thirteenth-century, Seinte Marherete into her first book, Three Methods for Reading the Thirteenth-century Seinte Marherete, published in 2008. In the past, she taught creative writing and medieval literature at the same university.

Cadwallader resides in the Adelaide Hills with her husband, Alan Cadwallader, an academic at the Australian Catholic University.

== Bibliography ==
- Cadwallader, Robyn (2008), Three Methods for Reading the Thirteenth-century Seinte Marherete : Archetypal, semiotic, and deconstructionist, Edwin Mellen Press, ISBN 9780773448407
- Cadwallader, Robyn; Friendly Street Poets (2010), I Painted Unafraid, Wakefield Press, ISBN 9781862548787
- Robyn Cadwallader, ed. (2015), We Are Better Than This : Essays addressing policies on asylum seekers, Foreword by Tim Winton, ATF Press, ISBN 9781921511721
- Cadwallader, Robyn (2015), The Anchoress, HarperCollins Publishers Australia, ISBN 9780732299217
- Cadwallader, Robyn (2018), Book of Colours, HarperCollins Publishers Australia, ISBN 9781460752210

== Awards and recognition ==
- 2011 ACT Writing and Publishing Awards Short Story Award for "The Day for Travelling"
- 2018 Canberra Critics Circle Awards — Fiction, winner for Book of Colours
- 2019 Voss Literary Prize, shortlisted for Book of Colours
- 2019 ACT Book of the Year award winner for Book of Colours
- 2023 ARA Historical Novel Prize longlisted for The Fire and the Rose
