= Mother superior =

Name of the head of some convents

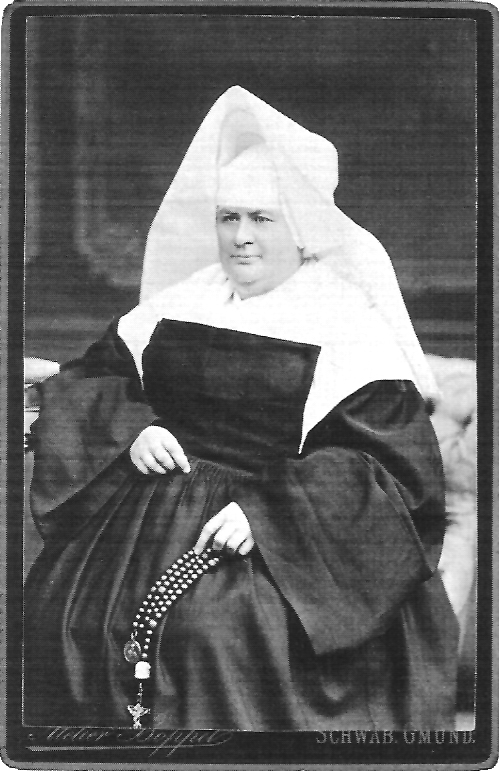
The mother superior of a convent of the Sisters of Charity in Schwäbisch Gmünd in 1870

In the Catholic Church, the head of a religious institute for women who is in charge of a convent, is sometimes referred to as mother superior. She could be the head of a monastic community or a religious congregation. Superiors of independent monasteries can also be abbesses or prioresses.

== Duties ==
The religious sister dedicates her life to God and to the service of the church. She is bound to God, the church and her community by vows or promises and is subordinate to her superior.

Through the vow of obedience, nuns and religious sisters follow the instructions of their legitimate superior in everything that concerns the life of the community, while respecting canon law and the constitutions of their religious institute. The superior is required to view her office as a service to the community, whose unity she must protect, and to encourage the sisters, by her example and the use of her authority, to lead an exemplary religious life. Canon law states that superiors "are to exercise their power, received from God through the ministry of the Church".

The superiors of independent monasteries and abbeys, like provincial and superiors general of some orders, are among the major religious superiors.

In order for members of the consecrated life to be appointed or elected to the office of superior, a suitable time is required after perpetual profession or promises, to be determined by proper law, or if it concerns major superiors, by the constitutions.

Catholic canon law mentions the superior of a nunnery with papal enclosure as the person who has to consent if the local bishop desires to enter the convent "and, for a grave cause and [...] of permitting others to be admitted to the cloister and the nuns to leave it for a truly necessary period of time". However, religious sister Mary Kenny observes that since the Second Vatican Council, "various styles of leadership in religious life have been tried with varying results over the years. There was a move all the way from a rather regimented, purely hierarchical style of leadership where 'Father or Mother knows best' to some communities choosing not to have an appointed leader".

== Address ==
The address of a superior is often "Mother Superior" or "Venerable Mother", sometimes only "Mother", and for higher superiors also "Most Venerable Mother" or "Reverend Mother". In contemporary usage, the address "Mother" or "Sister" is also used in conjunction with the religious name.
