= The Anchoress (book) =

2015 novel by Robyn Cadwallader

- Author: Robyn Cadwallader
- Set in: England, 1255
- Published: 2015
- Publisher: Sarah Crichton Books
- Pages: 320
- ISBN: 9780374104252
- OCLC: 896126800
- Dewey Decimal: 823.92

The Anchoress is a historical fiction novel by Robyn Cadwallader published by Sarah Crichton Books in 2015. The plot is set in the 13th-century England. It received People's Choice in the 2016 Australian Capital Territory Book of the Year awards.
