= Wanborough railway station =

Railway station in Surrey, England

Coordinates: 51.245°N 0.668°W

Wanborough
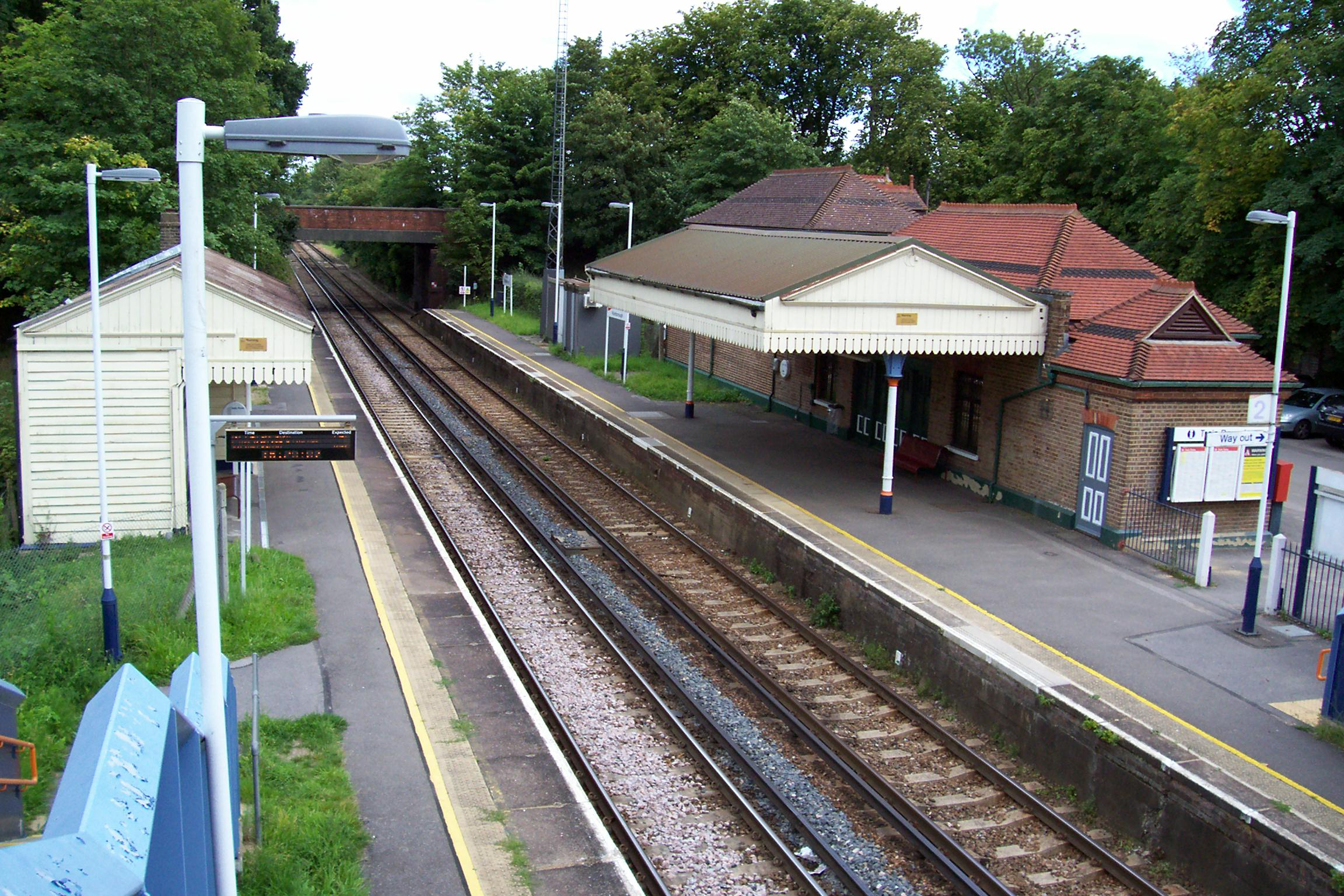

General information
- Location: Wanborough, Guildford; England
- Grid reference: SU931503
- Managed by: South Western Railway
- Platforms: 2

Other information
- Station code: WAN
- Classification: DfT category F2

History
- Opened: 1891
- Pre-grouping: London and South Western Railway
- Post-grouping: Southern Railway

Passengers
- 2020/21: ▼17,994
- 2021/22: ▲47,502
- 2022/23: ▲57,248
- 2023/24: ▼54,294
- 2024/25: ▲62,150
Location
Notes
- Passenger statistics from the Office of Rail and Road

Wanborough railway station is in Flexford, Surrey, England. It serves the villages of Normandy to the north and Wanborough to the south.

South Western Railway operates the station and most of the trains that serve it; Great Western Railway also provides a limited service. The station lies on the Aldershot to Guildford line and the North Downs Line, 34 miles 29 chains (55.3 km) from London Waterloo.

== History ==
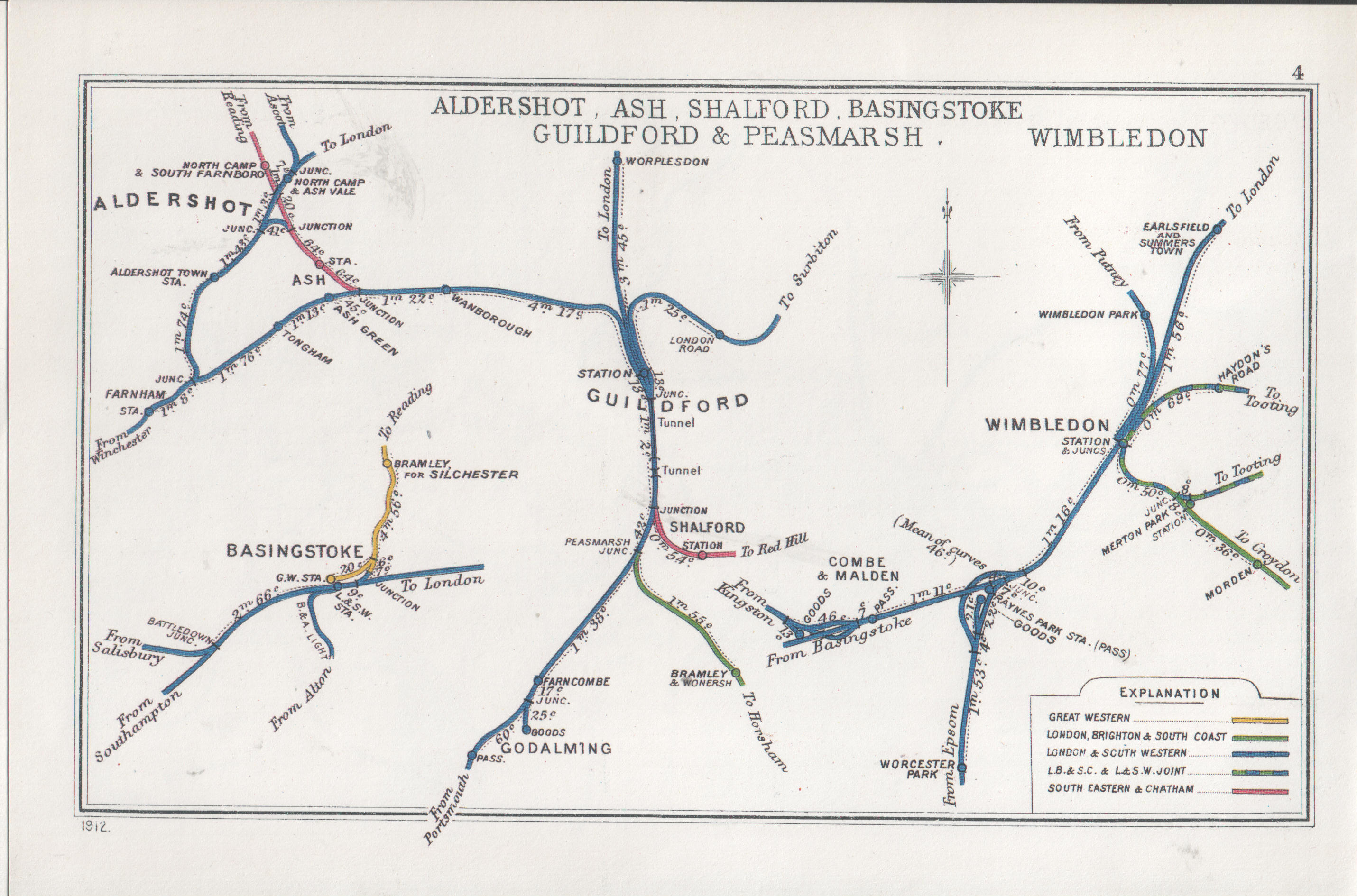
A 1912 Railway Clearing House map of lines around Wanborough

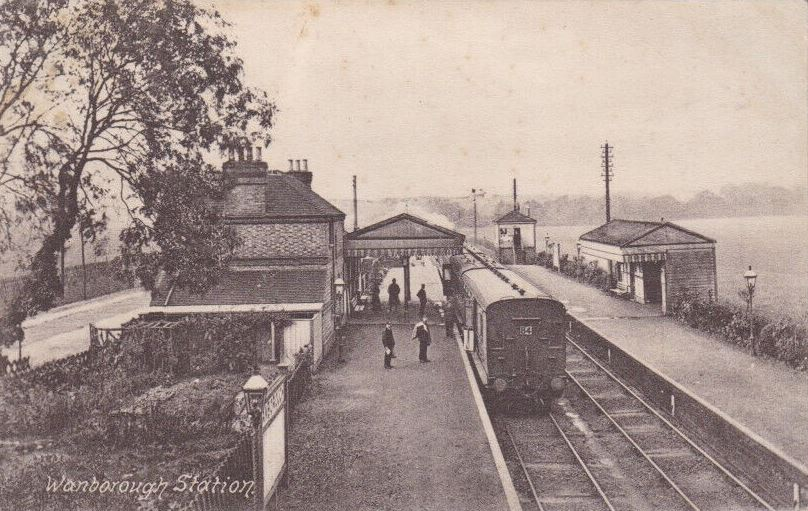
Wanborough station, circa 1910

The London and South Western Railway opened the station on its Guildford to Aldershot line in 1891. British Rail (BR) closed the station's signal box in 1966, on the day that it commissioned the then-new signal box at Ash Crossing. Ash Crossing signal box has itself since been decommissioned and demolished. BR made Wanborough unstaffed in 1987. The station is 34 miles 29 chains (55.3 km) from Waterloo (measured via Worplesdon and milepost 30 1/4 at Guildford), and has two platforms, which can each accommodate a four-coach train.

=== Historical services ===
Much of Wanborough's train service has been remarkably unchanged over the years. Historical services at Wanborough (from Guildford) to Ascot are shown below, for Monday-Friday and after the morning rush hour, in the following years:

- 1937: Times - Difficult to confirm all as times shown from Waterloo but basically at 0934, 1005 then at :35 and :05 till 2205 and then some later trains
- 1939: Times 0937, 1007, 1039, 1109, 1137, 1237 and half-hourly to 0007 (next morning)
- 1957: Times 0937, 1007, 1039, 1109, 1137, 1237, 1307, 1309, 1407, 1439, 1507, 1537, 1609, 1637, 1709, 1739, 1809, 1840, 1907, 1937, 2010, 2037, 2109, 2207, 2237,2307 (last service one hour earlier than in 1939)
- 2010: Times 0936 and half-hourly till 2306

== Services ==
The typical off-peak service is:

- Two trains per hour in each direction between Guildford and Farnham via Aldershot, operated by South Western Railway. On Sundays, the service is reduced to hourly in each direction with westbound services running to and from Ascot instead of Farnham.
- A small number of Great Western Railway services between Reading and Gatwick Airport via Guildford call at the station during peak hours.

Preceding station	National Rail	Following station
Guildford	South Western Railway; Farnham to Guildford Line	Ash
Guildford	Great Western Railway North Downs Line Peak Hours Only	Ash
	Disused railways	
Guildford Line and station open	Southern Railway Alton Line	Ash Green Halt Line and station closed
