= Alton line =

Railway line in South East England

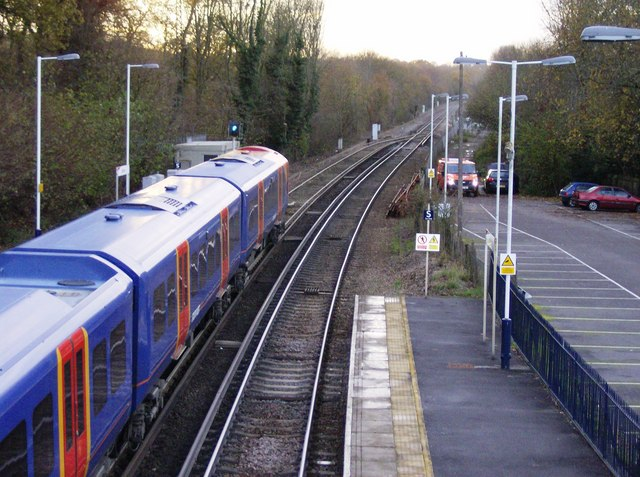
- A South West Trains Class 450 at Bentley station in November 2007

Overview
- Status: Operational
- Owner: Network Rail
- Locale: South East England
- Termini: Pirbright Junction; Alton
- Stations: 5

Service
- Type: Heavy rail
- System: National Rail
- Operator: South Western Railway
- Depot: Farnham Traincare Depot
- Rolling stock: Class 450, Class 444

History
- Opened: 1849–1870

Technical
- Track gauge: 1,435 mm (4 ft 8 1/2 in) standard gauge
- Electrification: Third rail, 750 V DC
- Operating speed: 70 mph (110 km/h) maximum
Route map
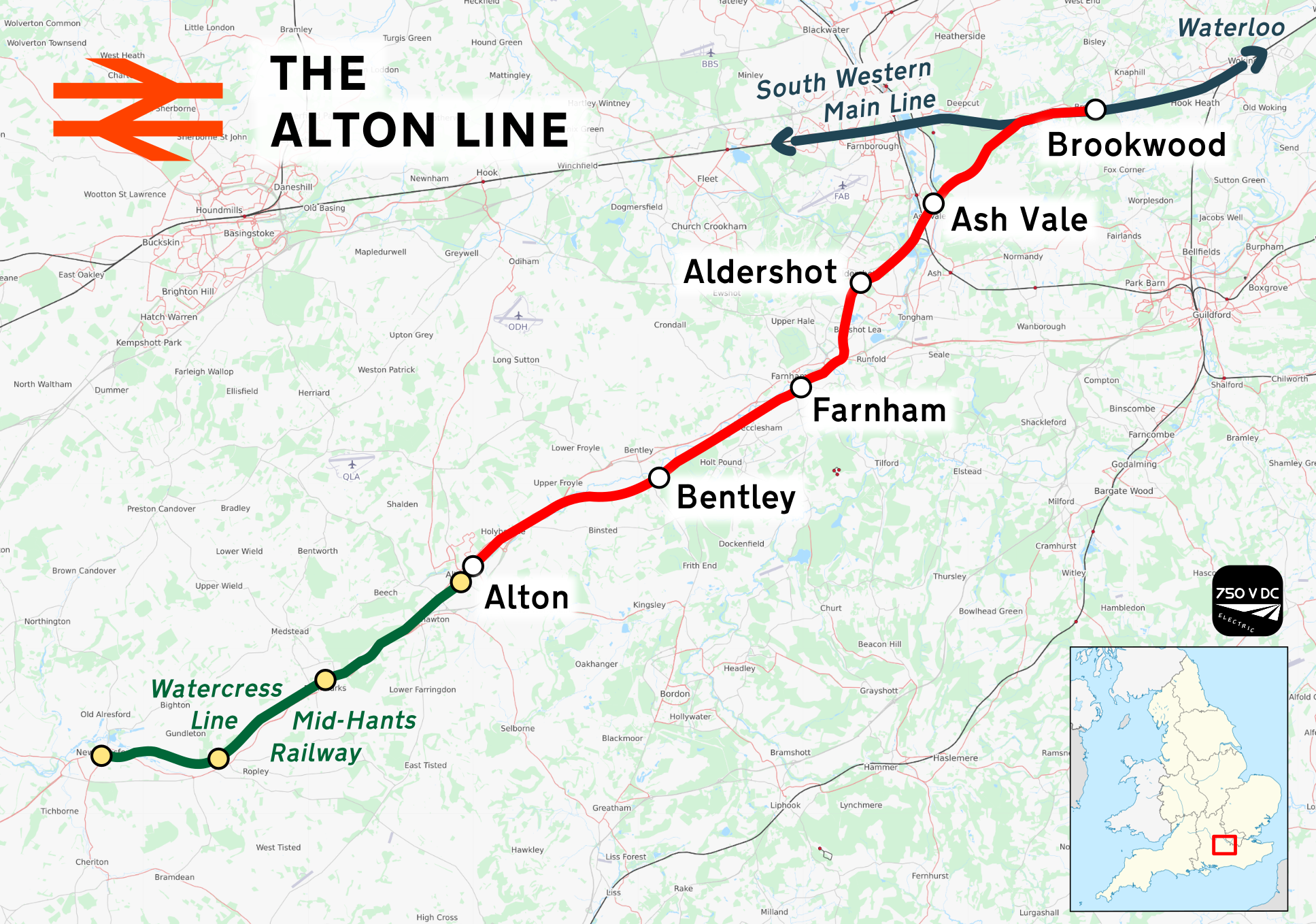

The Alton line is a railway line in Hampshire and Surrey, England, operated by South Western Railway; it is a relatively long branch of the South West Main Line.

The branch leaves the main line at Pirbright Junction to the west of Brookwood station, Surrey, then turns to the south-west. The route crosses and recrosses the Surrey/Hampshire border, serving the towns of Aldershot and Farnham, before reaching its present-day terminus at Alton in East Hampshire. The line originally continued west to Winchester; the section between Alton and New Alresford is preserved as the heritage Watercress line.

The Alton line was electrified (750 V DC third rail) during the late inter-war years by Southern Railway. Steam trains connected to the Mid Hants Watercress Railway (by way of rolling stock supply or special excursion) operate on the line.

== Route ==
=== Infrastructure ===
The Alton line is a standard-gauge railway line in South East England. It runs for 17 miles 29 chains (27.9 km) from the South West Main Line at Pirbright Junction in Surrey to Alton in Hampshire. The line is electrified using the 750 V DC third-rail system and is double track between Pirbright Junction and Farnham. Between Farnham and Alton, there is an 8 mi (13 km) single-track section, although trains may pass at Bentley station. The entire line is controlled by Woking Area Signalling Centre; the signalling system uses track circuits, with the exception of the Aldershot station area, which uses the absolute block method. The maximum permitted speed on the line is 70 mph (110 km/h) and passenger trains from Alton typically reach Brookwood on the South West Main Line in around 30–35 minutes.

At Pirbright Junction, a flyover allows trains heading from Alton towards London to pass over all four tracks of the South West Main Line. There are two additional junctions with National Rail lines: Ash Vale Junction allows trains to access the Ascot–Ash Vale line and Aldershot North Junction allows trains to access the spur towards the North Downs Line. At the southern end of the line, the connection to the Watercress Line, a heritage railway, is fully signalled.

There are two tunnels on the Alton line: the longest is the 418 yd (382 m) Foxhills Tunnel, between Pirbright Junction and Ash Vale, which runs beneath Pirbright Common; the shorter 76 yd (69 m) Aldershot Tunnel, between Ash Vale and Aldershot, passes under Redan Hill. The Alton line crosses the Basingstoke Canal twice: at Ash Vale and Aldershot Railway Bridges. The level crossing at Farnham, where the line crosses the B3001, is one of the most misused in the Network Rail Wessex Region. Between Farnham and Alton, the line parallels the north branch of the River Wey.

=== Stations and services ===
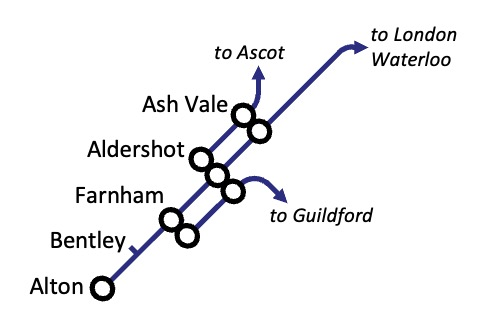
Off-peak service pattern (Monday–Saturday): Each line represents two trains per hour, although Bentley station is served by only one train per hour in each direction.

All five stations on the line—Ash Vale, Aldershot, Farnham, Bentley and Alton—are managed by South Western Railway (SWR), which operates all passenger services. Aldershot and Alton have three platforms, although Platform 3 at the latter is used exclusively by the Watercress Line. (Note: The Watercress Line side of Alton station also has a non-platform loop to allow locomotives to run around.) The other stations have two platforms each. (Note: Most trains use Platform 1 at Bentley; Platform 2 is used when trains need to pass, generally only at peak times.)

Three distinct passenger services run on the Alton line, all of which are operated by SWR:

- London Waterloo to Alton via Woking services travel along the full length of the line; (Note: On Sundays, trains between London Waterloo and Alton split from and join to trains serving Basingstoke at Woking.)
- Ascot to Aldershot via Frimley services travel on the line between Ash Vale Junction and Aldershot; (Note: On Sundays, the Ascot–Aldershot and Farnham–Guildford services are combined. Trains reverse at Aldershot and do not serve Farnham.)
- Guildford to Farnham via Ash services travel on the line between Aldershot North Junction and Farnham.

Passenger services are typically operated by Class 450 electric multiple units, although Class 701 units are expected to operate services north of Farnham via Ash Vale.

Stations on the Alton line (ordered from north to south)
Station	Distance from London Waterloo	Number of platforms	Opening date	Original name	Ref.
Ash Vale	32 mi 38 ch (52.3 km) measured via Brookwood	2	2 May 1890	North Camp & Ash Vale	
Aldershot	35 mi 00 ch (56.3 km) measured via Brookwood	3	2 May 1870		
Farnham	40 mi 33 ch (65.0 km) measured via Tongham	2	9 October 1849		
Bentley	44 mi 24 ch (71.3 km) measured via Tongham	2	July 1854		
Alton	49 mi 13 ch (79.1 km) measured via Tongham	3 (2 for Alton line)	28 July 1852 relocated 2 October 1865		

=== Farnham Traincare Depot ===
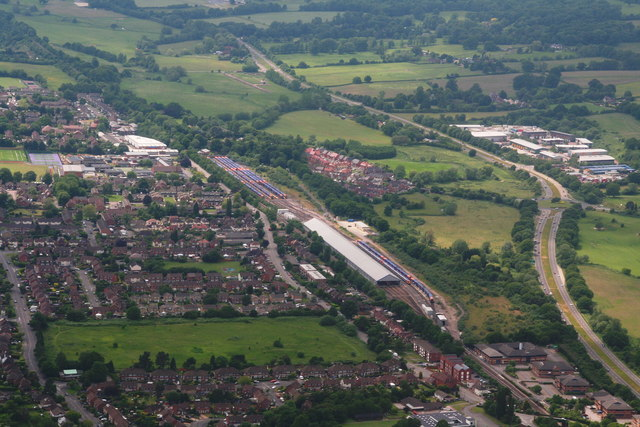
Farnham Traincare Depot from the air in June 2015

Farnham Traincare Depot (51.2051°N 0.8102°W) is located on Weydon Lane in Wrecclesham; it is close to the border between Surrey and Hampshire, in between Farnham and Bentley stations. SWR uses the depot, as part of their franchise agreement; it houses mainly Class 450 electric multiple units, but also Class 444 and Class 701 units. Before the introduction of the 701/5 units, the depot has been used as sidings for the fleet awaiting their first runs in passenger operation.

The depot was opened by the Southern Railway, at the time of the electrification of the Portsmouth and Alton lines in 1937. The company had wanted to build the facility at Alton, but the local authority had refused permission and it was constructed at Farnham instead. The depot was refurbished for the introduction of modern units when slam-door trains were replaced circa 2005. At the same time, disused quarry and ballast dump sidings behind the carriage shed were removed and a number of outdoor sidings were laid for overnight storage and servicing of units.

== History ==
=== The 1840s and 1850s ===
In 1845, the London and South Western Railway (LSWR) proposed two lines to serve Farnham and Alton. The two market towns were at the centre of a large barley-growing area and the promoters hoped to transport 145,000 barrels of ale annually. They also saw an opportunity to carry building materials, including stone quarried from east Hampshire. Plans were deposited with Parliament for a branches from Pirbright and from Guildford, which were to converge at Ash Green Halt before heading south-west towards Farnham.

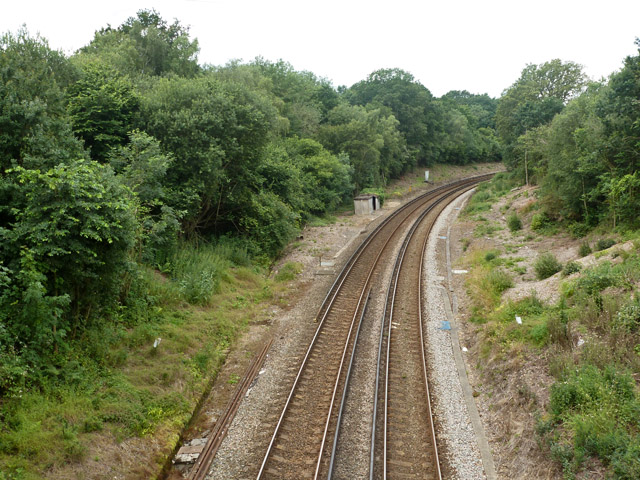
The former Ash Junction from the east: The RG&RR line (now the North Downs Line) to Ash curves to the right, but the former LSWR line to Farnham via Ash Green Halt continued straight ahead.

The London and South Western Railway (Farnham and Alton Branch) Act 1846 authorised the construction of the line from Guildford to Alton. The Reading, Guildford and Reigate Railway (RG&RR) was granted running powers between Guildford and Ash Junction, from where it would branch north-westwards towards Reading. The LSWR line was to continue to Alton via Ash Green Halt (initially called Ash), Farnham and Bentley. The act explicitly authorised the construction of level crossings where the route intersected local roads.

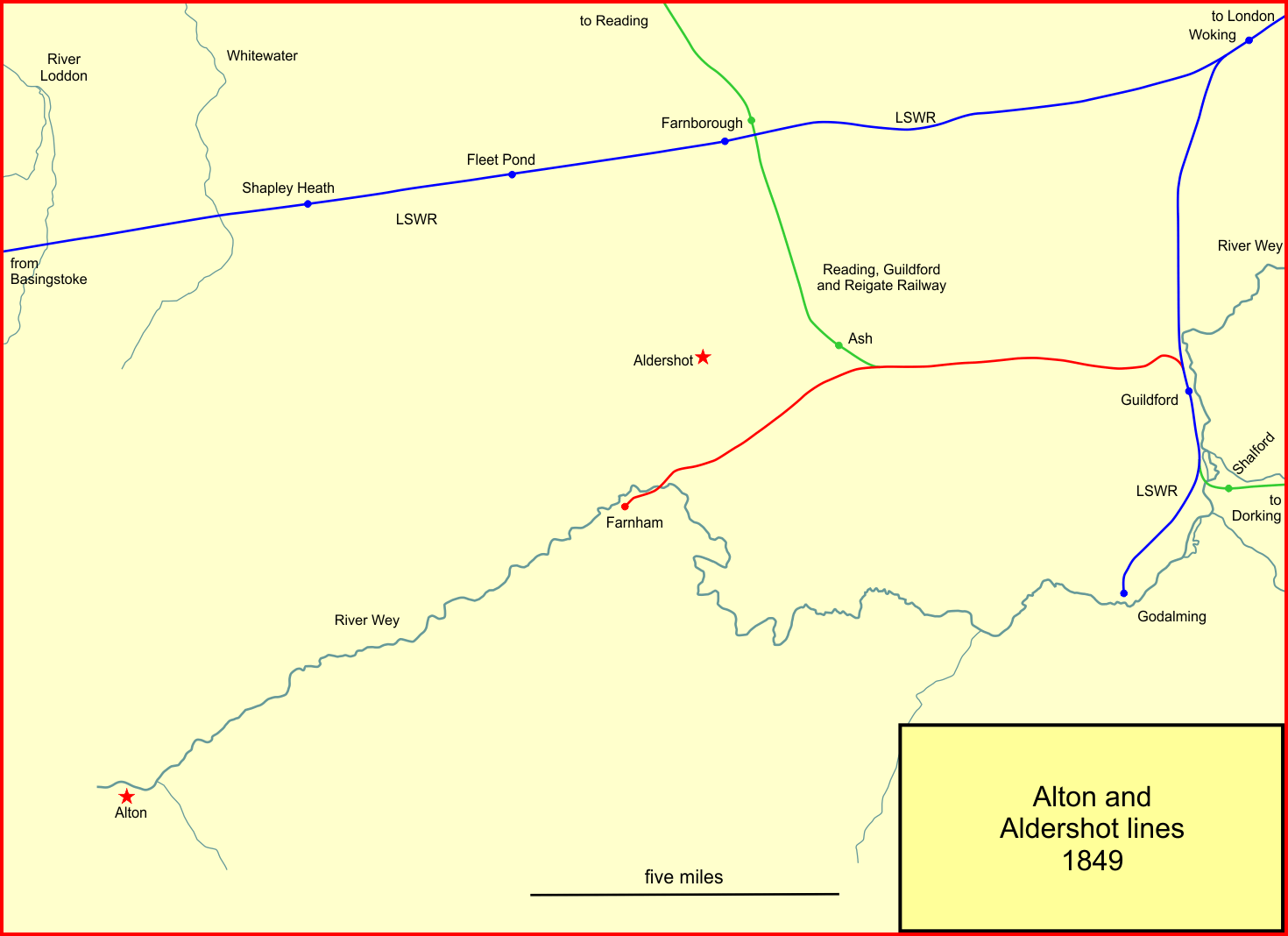
Railway lines in west Surrey and north-east Hampshire in 1849

The contract for construction was awarded to Thomas Brassey, who was to be paid £145,500 (equivalent to £14.67 million in 2025). The LSWR opened the double-track line from Guildford to Ash Junction on 20 August 1849, when the South Eastern Railway (SER) began running Guildford–Reading services on behalf of the RG&RR. The single-track line to Farnham, with an intermediate halt at Ash Green, opened on 8 October that year. (Note: A single-track engine shed was constructed to the west of Farnham station when the line opened in October 1849. Its purpose is unclear, but it is likely to have housed a locomotive used to maintain the line. It is thought to have closed in around 1890.) The railway historian R.A. Williams, notes that the LSWR and SER "worked uneasily together" as the two companies competed for passengers travelling from west Surrey to London. In 1858, the SER offered a free bus service from Farnham town centre to its station at Ash in the hope of attracting custom from its rival.

Work on the extension from Farnham to Alton did not begin until October 1850. The line was originally to have been double track, but the LSWR directors had become sceptical of the traffic potential and sought to reduce costs by laying only a single line. Brassey was able to complete the work at a cost of £3,500 per mile (£407,000 in 2025), meaning that the line cost only £30,000 (£3.02 million in 2025) more to build than would have been lost by abandoning it. The extension south-westwards from Farnham opened on 28 July 1852. The station at Alton was laid out as a terminus, and the intermediate station at Bentley, around 1 mi (1.6 km) from the village it serves, opened two years later.

A public freight siding was opened at Tongham with the line, but initially no passenger facilities were provided in the village. A station was opened in the same location as the sidings in October 1856, to serve the new army camps at Aldershot that had been under construction since February 1854. A single-track branch was laid from Tongham to South Camp, but was removed in mid-1859 when building work was complete.

=== The 1860s and 1870s ===
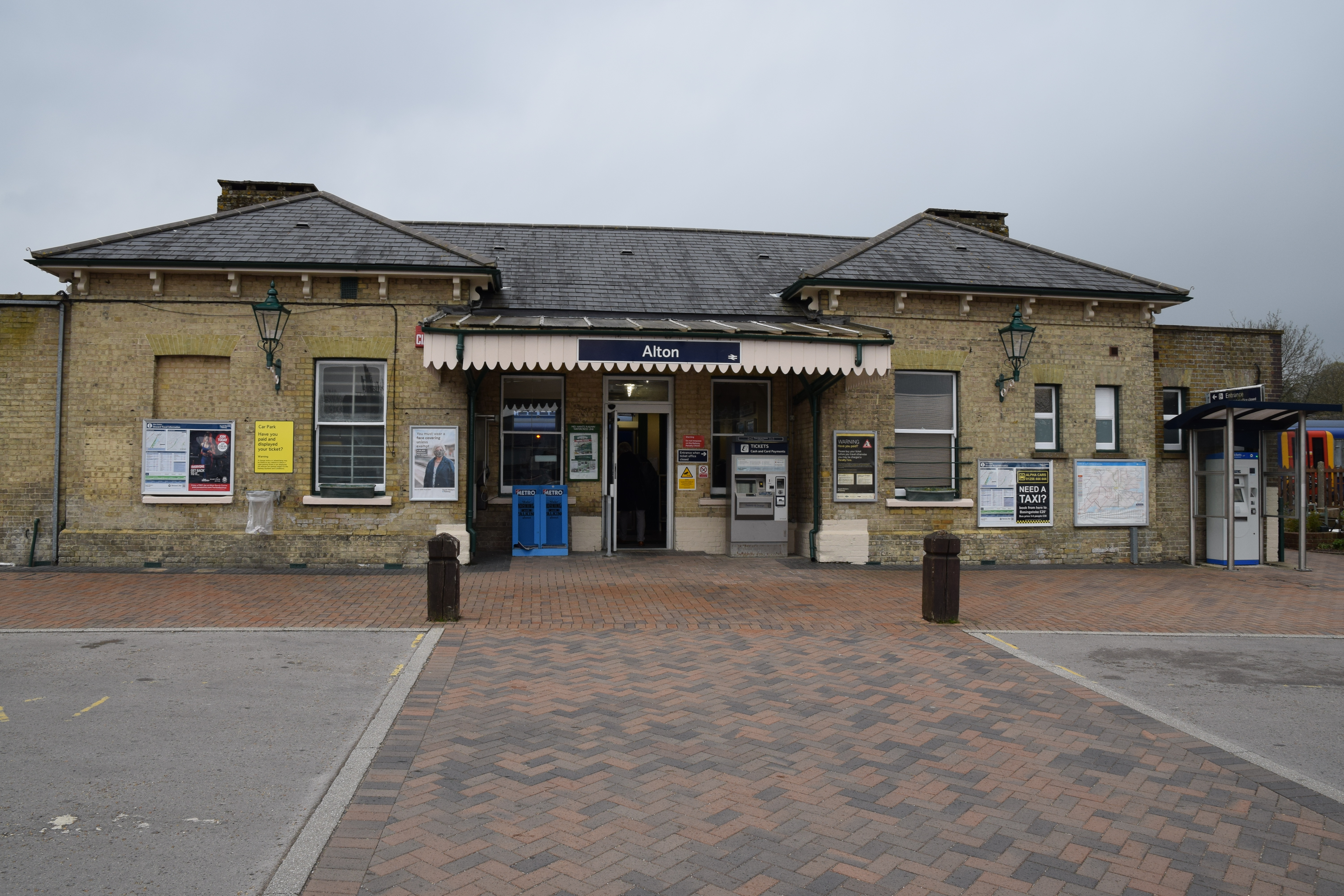
Alton station was relocated to its current site on 2 October 1865, when the Mid-Hants Railway opened to Winchester.

The independent Mid-Hants Railway proposed the extension of the line west from Alton, with the intention of providing a direct link between the army camps at Aldershot and the ports of the south coast. The line was authorised on 18 June 1861. (Note: Until 1 January 1865, the Mid-Hants Railway was known as the "Alton, Alresford, Winchester Railway". The change of name was authorised by the Mid Hants Act 1864, which also allowed the company to raise additional capital to build its line.) The LSWR was sceptical of the new route, fearing that traffic would be taken away from its main line via Basingstoke. Nevertheless, the company agreed to operate passenger services on 17 February 1865, and the new route to Winchester opened on 2 October that year. Initially most trains ran as extensions of existing Guildford–Alton services.

By the end of the Crimean War in early 1856, the number of military personnel garrisoned at Aldershot was over 14,000, growing to over 29,000 that August. A horse-drawn omnibus service to Farnham began that year, but the town was not directly connected to the passenger railway network and the closest stations were at Tongham, North Camp and Farnborough.

The first proposals for a railway through Aldershot were put forward in 1857 and 1863. However, both schemes, which would have linked the growing town to the South West Main Line at Farnborough, failed in Parliament. In 1864, an independent company submitted the Farnham, Aldershot and Woking Junction Bill, but the promoters were persuaded to withdraw their plans by the LSWR which submitted a similar scheme to Parliament the following year. The only major differences between the two proposals were that the link to North Camp station in the 1864 plans was eliminated and that the link to Ash station was replaced by a shorter, more tightly curved spur. The total cost of the line was estimated to be £160,000 (equivalent to £17.4 million in 2025) and the LSWR bill requested borrowing powers for up to £53,330 (£5.79 million in 2025).

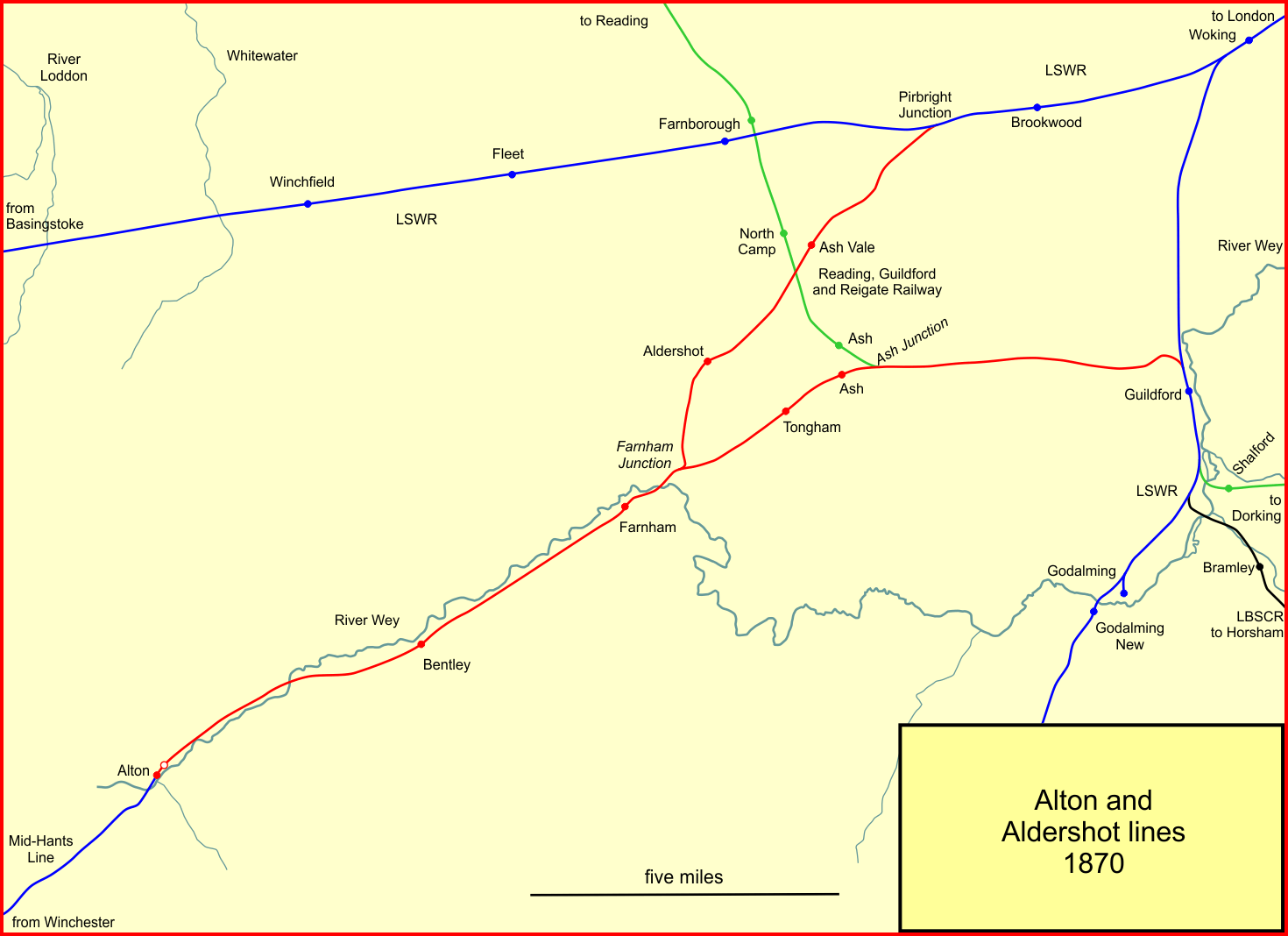
Railway lines in west Surrey and north-east Hampshire in 1870

The line from Pirbright Junction to Farnham Junction was authorised in the South Western (Aldershot) Railway Act 1865 on 19 June 1865. It was built with two tracks from the South West Main Line to Aldershot, from where it continued south as a single line towards Farnham. The original intention was for the line to pass through Redan Hill in a cutting, but a tunnel was added to the scheme in 1866 at the request of the War Department. The army also insisted that the bridge over the Basingstoke Canal at Ash should include a 6 ft-wide (1.8 m) untracked section to allow military personnel to cross the waterway on foot.

Poor weather over the winter of 1869-70 delayed the opening of the Pirbright Junction–Farnham Junction line, but the first passenger services finally ran on 2 May 1870. The new line not only included new stations at Ash Vale and Aldershot, but also provided a more direct link to London from Farnham than the existing route via Guildford. The initial service was eight northbound and six southbound trains each day and trains from Aldershot typically reached London Waterloo in around 70 minutes. The single line from Aldershot to Farnham Junction was doubled on 10 March 1875. The first services over the Ash–Aldershot spur were run by the SER on 1 May 1879, and the LSWR launched a Guildford–Aldershot via Ash passenger service on 1 October 1882.

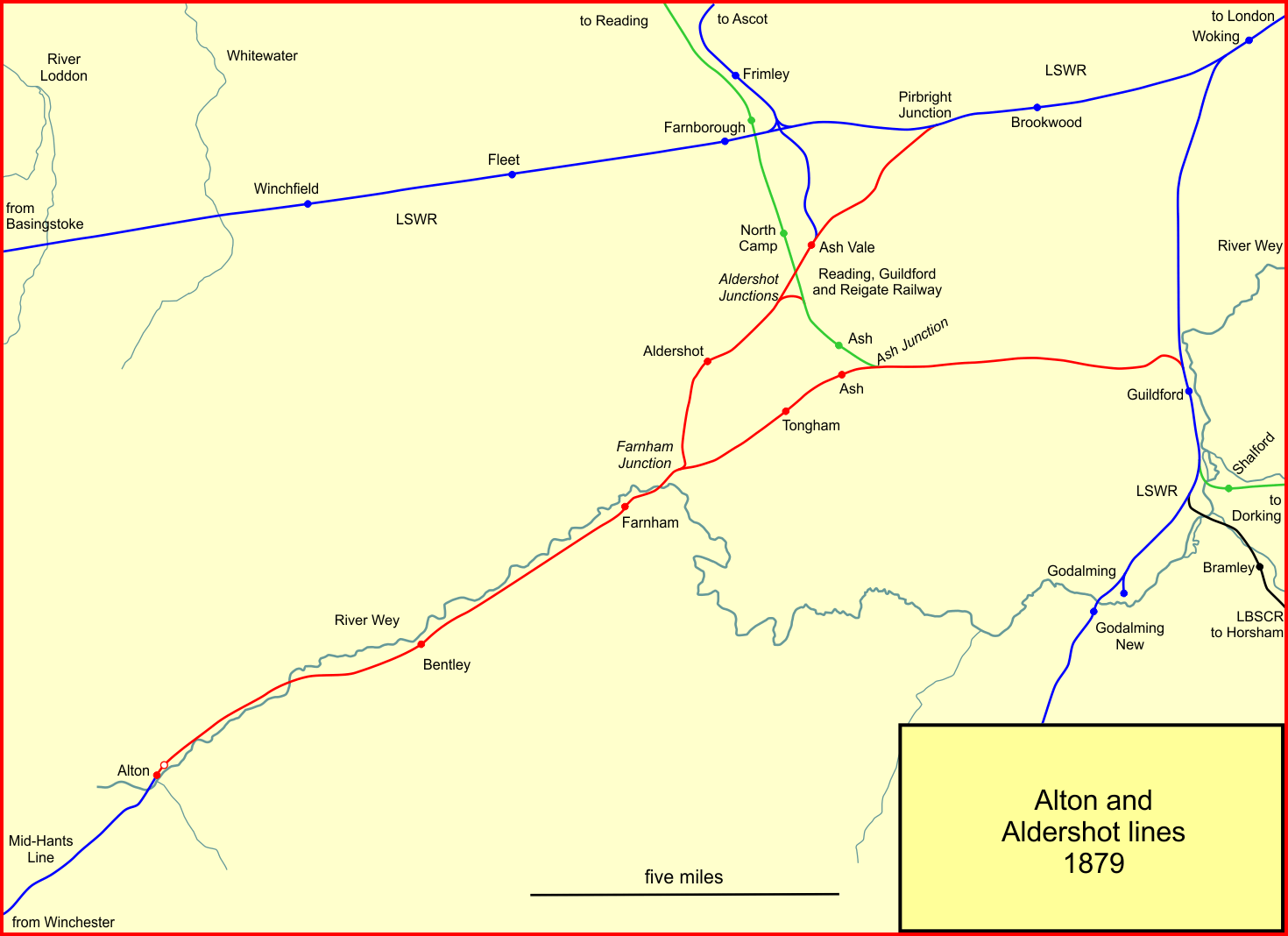
Railway lines in west Surrey and north-east Hampshire in 1879

The single frack from Ash Vale Junction to Frimley Junction opened on 2 June 1879, completing the Ascot–Ash Vale line. The new route provided a direct rail link from Aldershot to Camberley, the closest station to the Staff College for the British Armed Forces, although initially the majority of services on the southern part of the new line ran as shuttles between Frimley and Farnham.

=== Late 19th and early 20th centuries ===
Several infrastructure projects were undertaken in the late 19th and early 20th centuries. The single-track section between Ash Green Halt and Farnham was doubled in June 1884, and laying of a second track between Farnham and Alton was completed in June 1901. At the northern end of the route, the South West Main Line was widened from two tracks to four. As part of the first phase of these works, a flyover was opened at Pirbright Junction on 30 June 1901, allowing trains from Alton and Aldershot to pass over the main line on a bridge. A new signal box was installed at the junction in 1904, which remained operational until 1931. At the end of the 19th century, there were 20 trains per day between Farnham and London. The average journey time was 1 hour 31 minutes, but the fastest express took only 1 hour 5 minutes.

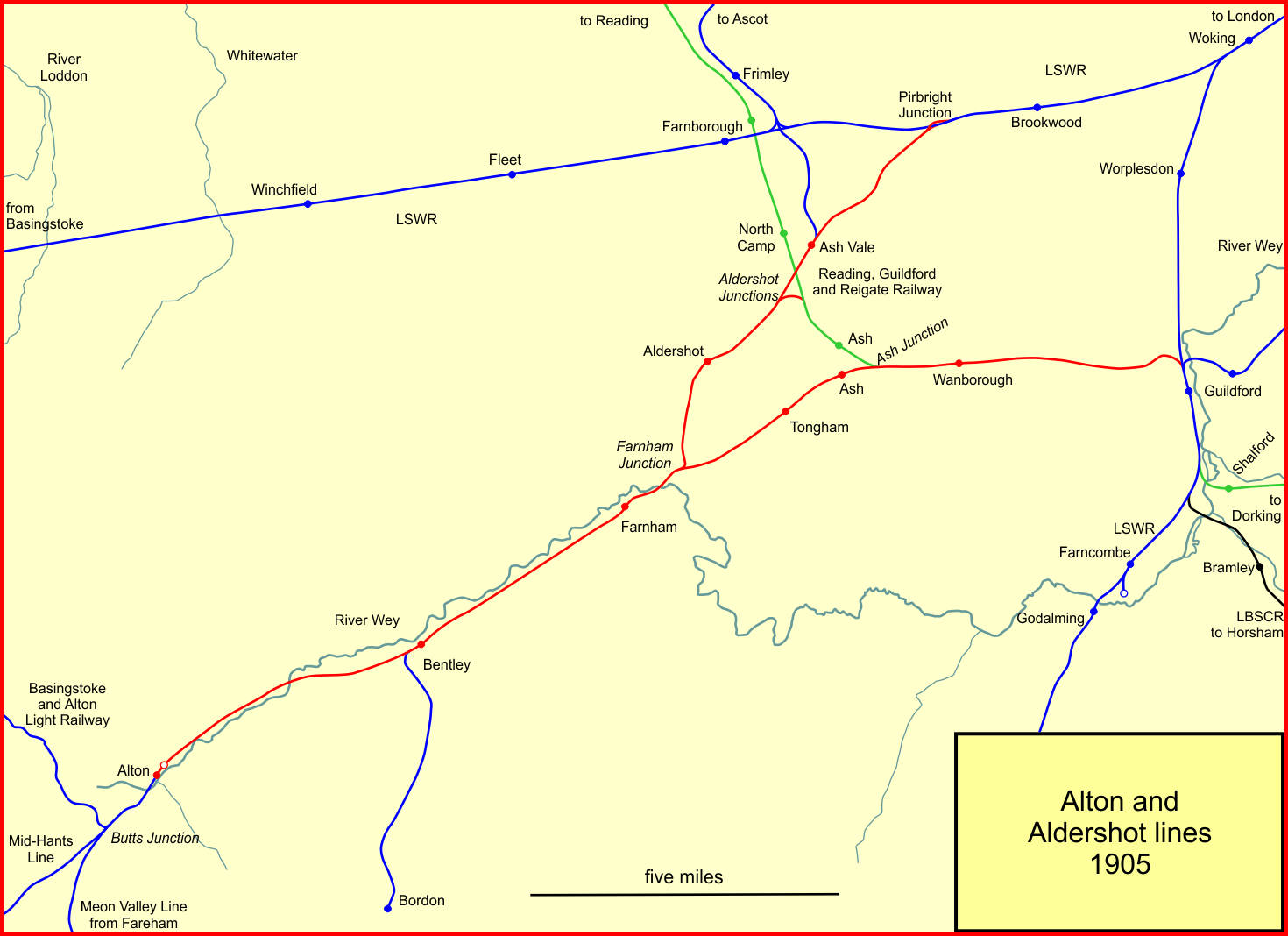
Railway lines in west Surrey and north-east Hampshire in 1905

Three further lines were opened at the west end of the Alton line in the early 1900s. Trains began running on the Basingstoke and Alton Light Railway on 1 June 1901, and on the Meon Valley Railway (MVR) on 1 June 1903. The capacity of Alton station was increased in 1903, with the creation of a third platform to accommodate MVR trains. The 4.5 mi (7.2 km) Bordon Light Railway (BLR), which branched from the Alton line at Bentley station, opened on 11 December 1905. It was primarily built for military traffic to Bordon and Longmoor Camps and was part-funded by the War Department. The line provided a connection at its southern end to the Longmoor Military Railway, which was opened in 1903. During the First World War military traffic on the BLR was heavy and on Sunday evenings in 1916, there were four direct trains to Bordon from London Waterloo via Aldershot.

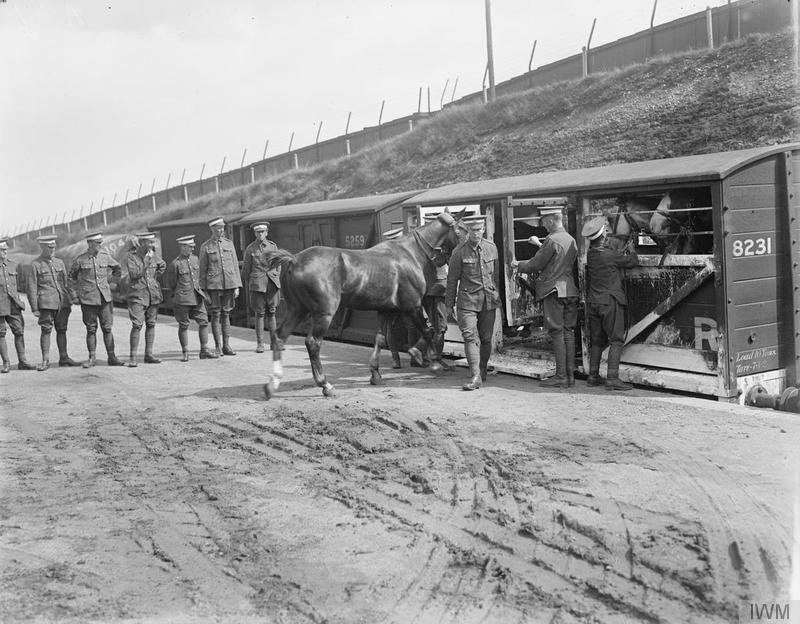
Army horses being loaded into trucks at Aldershot during the First World War

The railway continued to develop at Aldershot in the late 19th and early 20th centuries. The "Government Siding" was constructed in 1890 using materials previously used by the army in Sudan. It allowed equipment to be brought by rail to the military camps, where it could be unloaded away from the public goods yard at Aldershot station. The siding was extended during the Second Boer War, to enable it to accommodate the increased volume of military traffic. A platform was also provided to allow personnel to board or alight from military trains and additional sidings were added in 1912-13. During the First World War, the majority of military traffic was routed via Frimley, and the public rail service between Frimley and Ash Vale was suspended from August 1914 to November 1916. (Note: During the First World War, the majority of military traffic between Aldershot and the south coast was routed via Frimley instead of via the shorter, more steeply graded Mid-Hants route via Alton and Alresford. These trains reversed at Frimley to access the South West Main Line via the Sturt Lane curves, before running via Basingstoke.)

=== Southern Railway (1923–1947) ===
Under the Railways Act 1921, the LSWR became part of the Southern Railway (SR) in 1923. The SR began a process of rationalisation on the section of the Alton line between Ash and Farnham Junctions, which had been opened in 1849. Staff were withdrawn from Tongham and Ash Green Halt on 1 December 1926 and the goods facilities at the latter closed the same day. The section was converted to single track between 1930 and 1932, by which time there were only five passenger trains and up to two goods trains in each direction. (Note: In February 1932, a system of working using electric tokens was instituted on the single line between Ash and Farnham Junctions.) The section closed completely to passengers on 4 July 1937, and during the Second World War, wagons were stored on the line between Tongham and Farnham Junction. Goods trains continued to serve Aldershot Gas Works until the late 1950s, but the line west of Tongham was lifted in late 1954. The final goods train from Tongham ran on 1 January 1961 and the remaining track from Ash Junction was lifted.

Electrification of the Alton line between Pirbright Junction and Farnham had been proposed in 1922, but it was not until 1935 that work began. The entirely of the line north of Alton was electrified using the third-rail system, under the "Portsmouth No. 1" programme. Although electrification between Pirbright Junction and Farnham could be justified on commercial grounds, the continuation to Alton was permitted by the Treasury with the aim of reducing operating costs. A five-road carriage shed was built at Farnham as part of the same programme to accommodate the new electric trains.

Trial running between Waterloo and Farnham began in January 1937 to allow for staff training. The electric multiple units operating these services used the same timings as steam locomotives until 4 July 1937 when the fully electric timetable between Alton and London began. A method of portion working was instituted in which trains to-and-from Alton combined with and split from those serving Portsmouth at Woking. Portion working ceased during the Second World War, but was reintroduced in 1945. Between 1937 and 1967, trains typically ran at half hourly intervals between London and Alton, with a typical journey time of 1 hour 20 minutes and the fastest express services taking 72 minutes. With the electrification of the Alton line, the vast majority of through services on the Mid-Hants line to Winchester ceased, although a daily Sandwich–Bournemouth Central service continued to operate via the route until the start of the Second World War. (Note: After electrification, most trains used Platform 1 at Alton, but there were some departures from Platform 3 at peak periods. No conductor rail was laid at Platform 2, which was used by branch line trains to Basingstoke and the Meon Valley.)

In July 1937, the SR launched a push-pull service from Ascot to Guildford, involving a reversal at Aldershot, operated using steam locomotives. Electric trains were introduced to this route on 1 January 1939.

=== Nationalisation (1948–1996) ===
Under the Transport Act 1947, the Alton line became part of the Southern Region of British Railways in 1948. A period of rationalisation began, starting with the dismantling of the disused track between Tongham and Farnham Junction. (Note: In the early 1990s, the A31 dual carriageway was built over the former alignment of the line between Tongham and Farnham Junction.) The line between Ash Junction and Tongham was finally closed on 2 January 1961, having been used exclusively for freight services since 1937. The signal box at Farnham Junction, which had been retained to increase the line capacity between Aldershot and Farnham, was closed in May 1964 and was demolished two years later.

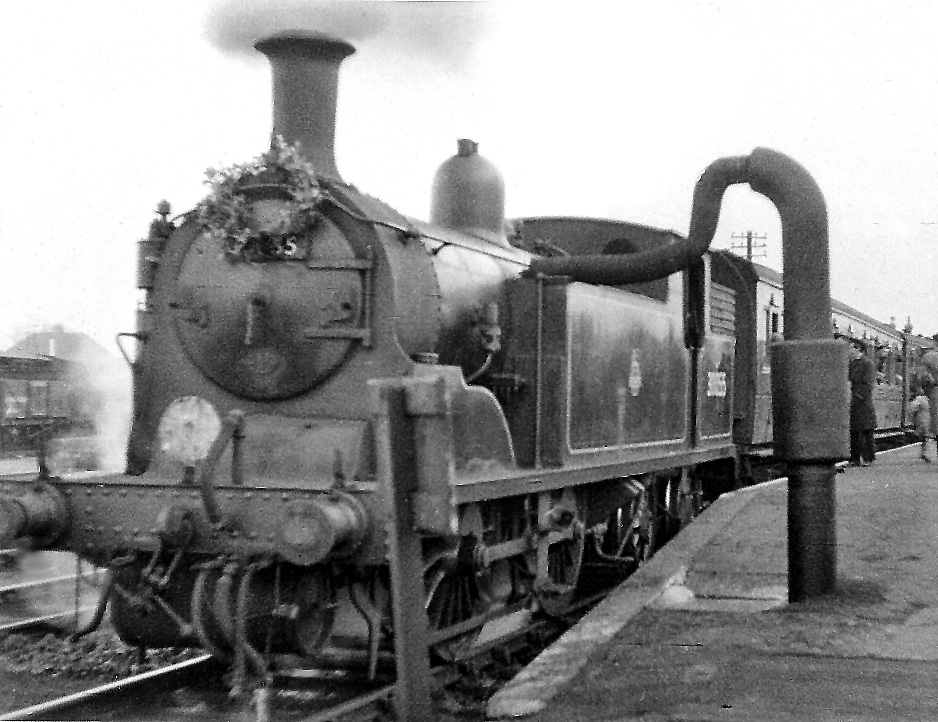
An M7 tank engine at Alton preparing to haul the final passenger service on the Meon Valley Railway on 5 February 1955.

Passenger services were withdrawn on the Meon Valley Railway on 5 February 1955, although freight workings continued between Alton and Farringdon until August 1968. The Beeching report, published in March 1963, proposed that passenger services should be withdrawn between Alton and Winchester, and this section of line closed, almost a decade later, on 7 February 1973. Traffic from the Alton line to the Longmoor Military Railway (LMR) had declined after 1948 and the Bordon Light Railway closed on 4 April 1966, with the LMR closing on 31 October 1969.

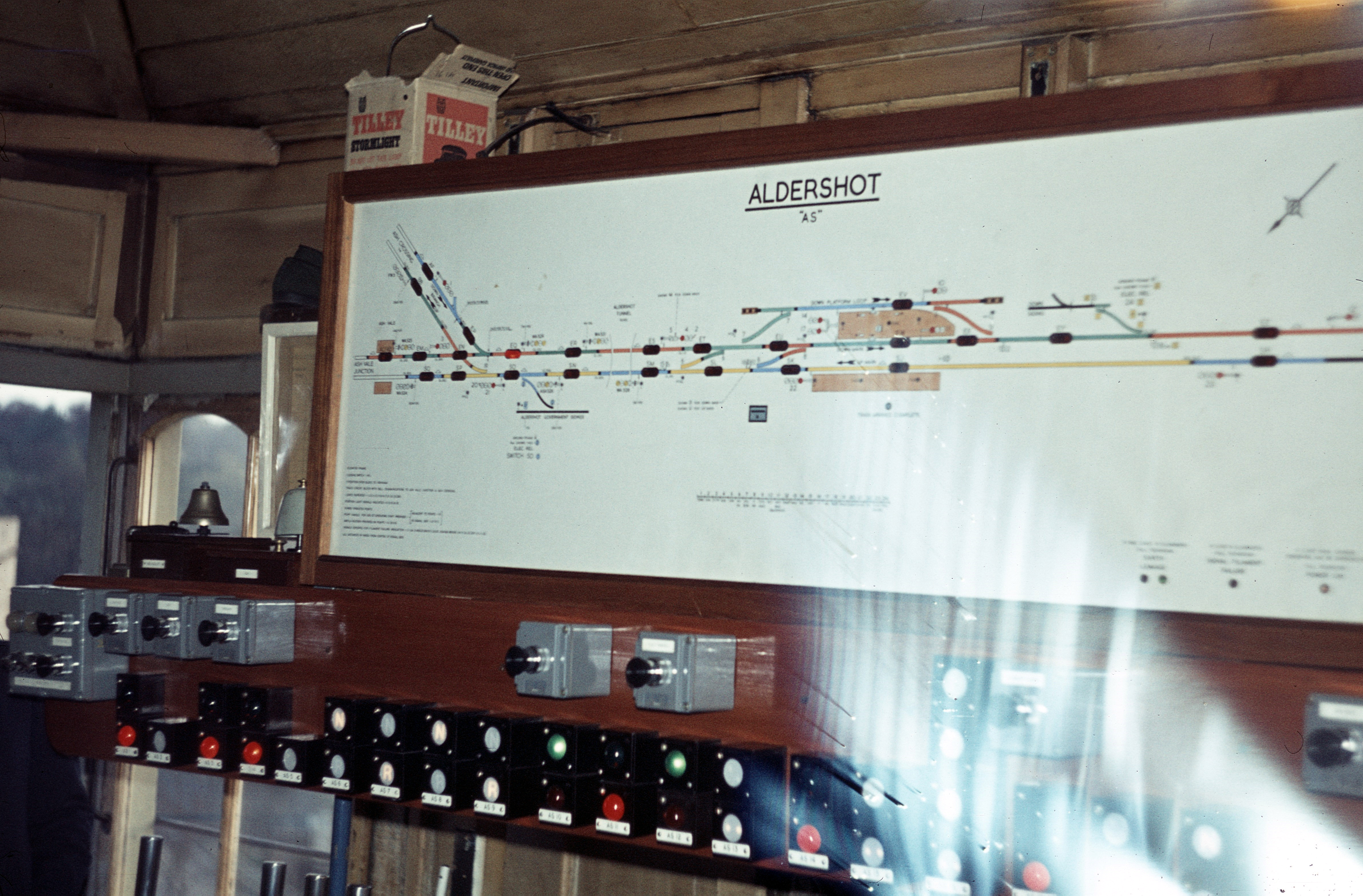
Aldershot Signal Box in November 1979

Rationalisation of the signalling system on the Alton line took place in the 1970s and early 1980s. "Farnham East" signal box closed 23 December 1973, with control of its area transferred to the existing "Farnham West" box. Similarly, "Aldershot B" signal box closed on 3 April 1977, with control of the line south of the station being transferred to the "Aldershot A" box. Bentley signal box closed on 19 December 1976 and the box at Alton shut on 28 September 1980. Improvement works to stations in the same period included the construction of a new station building at Ash Vale in 1972, and the renovation of the frontage of Aldershot station in 1988. Also in 1988, new facilities for traincrew were provided at Farnham station.

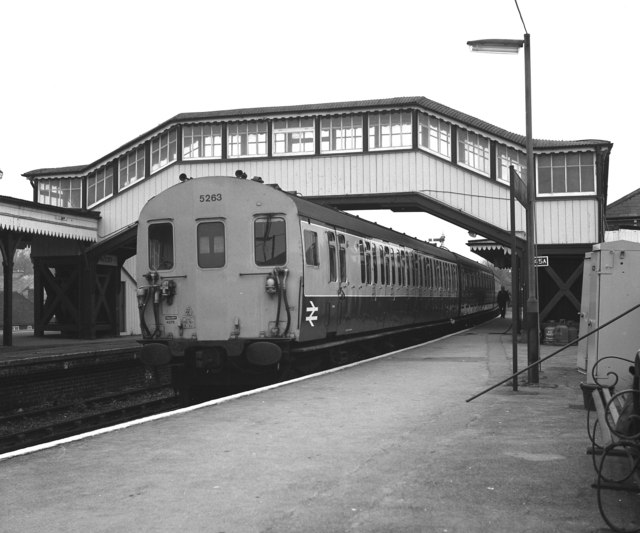
A Class 415 "4EPB" unit at Alton in 1980

Although the closure of the line between Farnham and Alton was never proposed, the decision was taken to remove one of the two tracks in that section. Single-line working was instituted in July 1985 and the passing loop at Bentley station was commissioned on 24 November that year. At the same time, the signalling system was upgraded to use track circuits and control of the section was transferred to a new panel at Farnham Signal Box. Redundant materials from the project were used to extend the Isle of Wight Steam Railway from Ashley to Smallbrook Junction in 1991. On 25 May 1985, the Watercress Line, which had started to run heritage trains between Ropley and Alresford in April 1977, began operating from Platform 3 at Alton station.

In 1982, the railways in Surrey and Hampshire came under the control of the London and South East sector of BR, which was rebranded to Network SouthEast (NSE) in June 1986. From 1989, the Alton line was part of the South West subsector of NSE and trains were run under the "Solent and Wessex" route brand. In preparation for privatisation, the South West Trains shadow franchise began running trains on the South West subsector on 1 April 1994.

=== Privatisation (1996–2025) ===
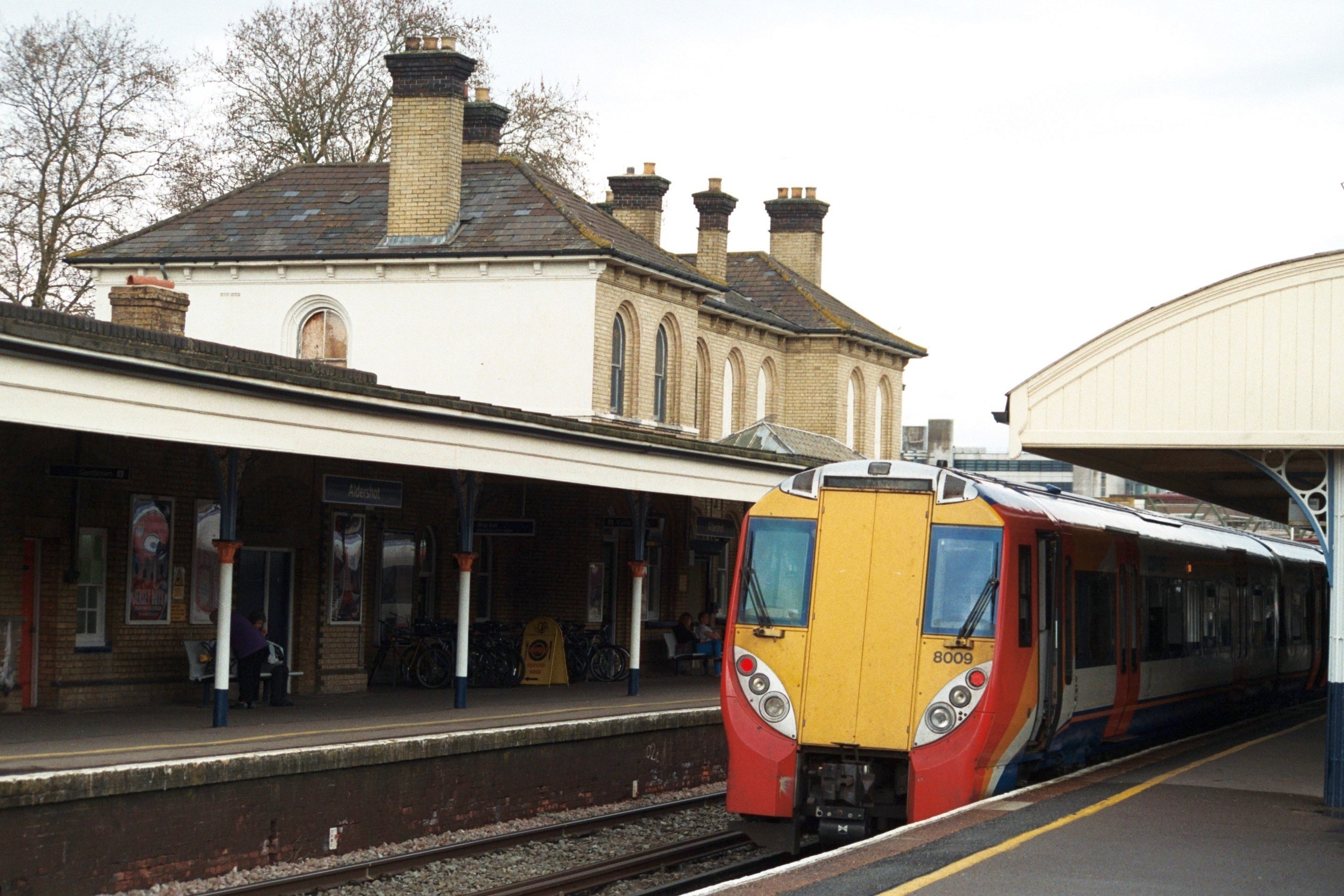
A Class 458 unit at Aldershot: These trains were introduced to the Alton line by South West Trains in February 2000.

South West Trains, a subsidiary of the Stagecoach Group, was awarded the franchise to operate passenger services between London Waterloo, west Surrey and Hampshire in December 1995. The company, the first privatised train operator in the UK, began running trains the following February. The franchise was renewed in 2002 and again in 2006. In 2017, the franchise was won by South Western Railway, jointly owned by FirstGroup and MTR Corporation; services were transferred to the new operator on 23 August that year.

Infrastructure improvements on the route in the 2010s included the resignalling of the entire line in 2013, with control transferred to the Woking Area Signalling Centre. The project included the closure of the signal boxes at Ash Vale Junction, Aldershot and Farnham, and all three were later demolished. At the same time, the loop at Bentley was extended to allow 12-coach trains to pass. In August 2019, a scheme to supply traction current to the line from a solar array was commissioned. Over 100 panels, capable of generating up to 30 kW were installed at a site adjacent to Aldershot station.

The first major change to passenger services on the Alton line since electrification was the splitting of the Ascot–Guildford service in May 2019: Two independent services, Ascot–Aldershot and Farnham–Guildford, now operate on weekdays and Saturdays, although the combined service continues to run on Sundays. The change was made to allow a direct, half-hourly rail service between Farnham and Guildford.

The Alton Line Users Association closed down in May 2022, having represented the interests of rail travellers on the line since 1974. The following month, a new Community Rail Partnership was launched covering stations between Alton, Ash Vale and Wanborough.

On 25 May 2025, passenger operations on the Alton line were transferred back to public control, when the SWR franchise expired.

== Locomotives and rolling stock ==
In the late 19th century, 4-4-2 tank engines designed by the LSWR Mechanical Engineer, William Adams, worked trains between Ascot and Farnham. Tank engines designed by his successor, Dugald Drummond, worked semi-fast services between London and Alton. From 1902, Q class 0-4-4T locomotives are known to have operated the Ash-Aldershot shuttle services, and were replaced by P Class 0-6-0 tank engines in the mid-1920s.

LSWR C8 class locomotives were introduced to the line in 1903 and E10 class engines began running services the following year. In the 1920s, T9s and H15s were used to haul mixed-traffic trains. U class tender engines were introduced in 1928, replaced by D15 class locomotives in 1935. An articulated rubber-tyred diesel railcar was tested on the line in May 1932, but it limited passenger capacity and inability to operate track circuits meant that it was not used in regular service thereafter. In the years leading up to electrification of the line east of Alton in 1937, Waterloo to Winchester trains were hauled by H15, U and T14 locomotives. During the Second World War, goods services were operated by Q1 class 0-6-0 locomotives.

After the Second World War, most services that had not been converted to electric traction were hauled by M7 class tank engines. A T9 locomotive is known to have hauled parcel trains and freight services in the 1960s were operated by U class, N class and Standard Class 4 tender engines.

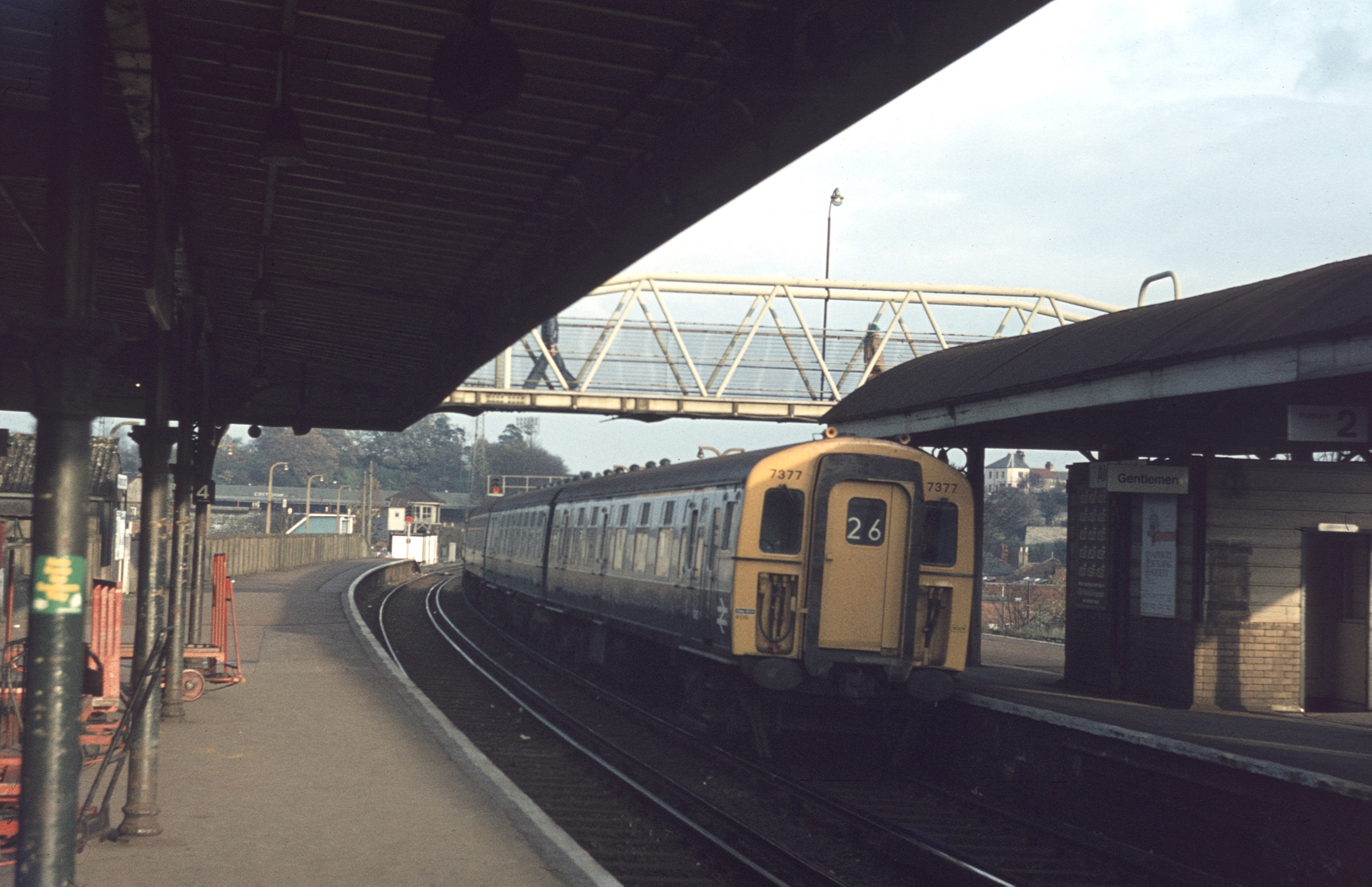
A Class 421 "4CIG" unit at Aldershot in November 1979

Following electrification of the Alton line in 1937, passenger services were run by Class 404 "4COR" and Class 401 "2BIL" units. Class 402 "2HAL", Class 415 "4EPB" and Class 416 "2EPB" units worked on the line in the 1960s, as did "4SUB" units, which were retired in May 1972. Following an extensive overhaul in 1977, Class 487 units were tested between Farnham and Alton before re-entering passenger service on the Waterloo & City line. Class 421 "4CIG" and Class 423 "4VEP" units were used on the line in the 1980s and were withdrawn by South West Trains in May 2005.

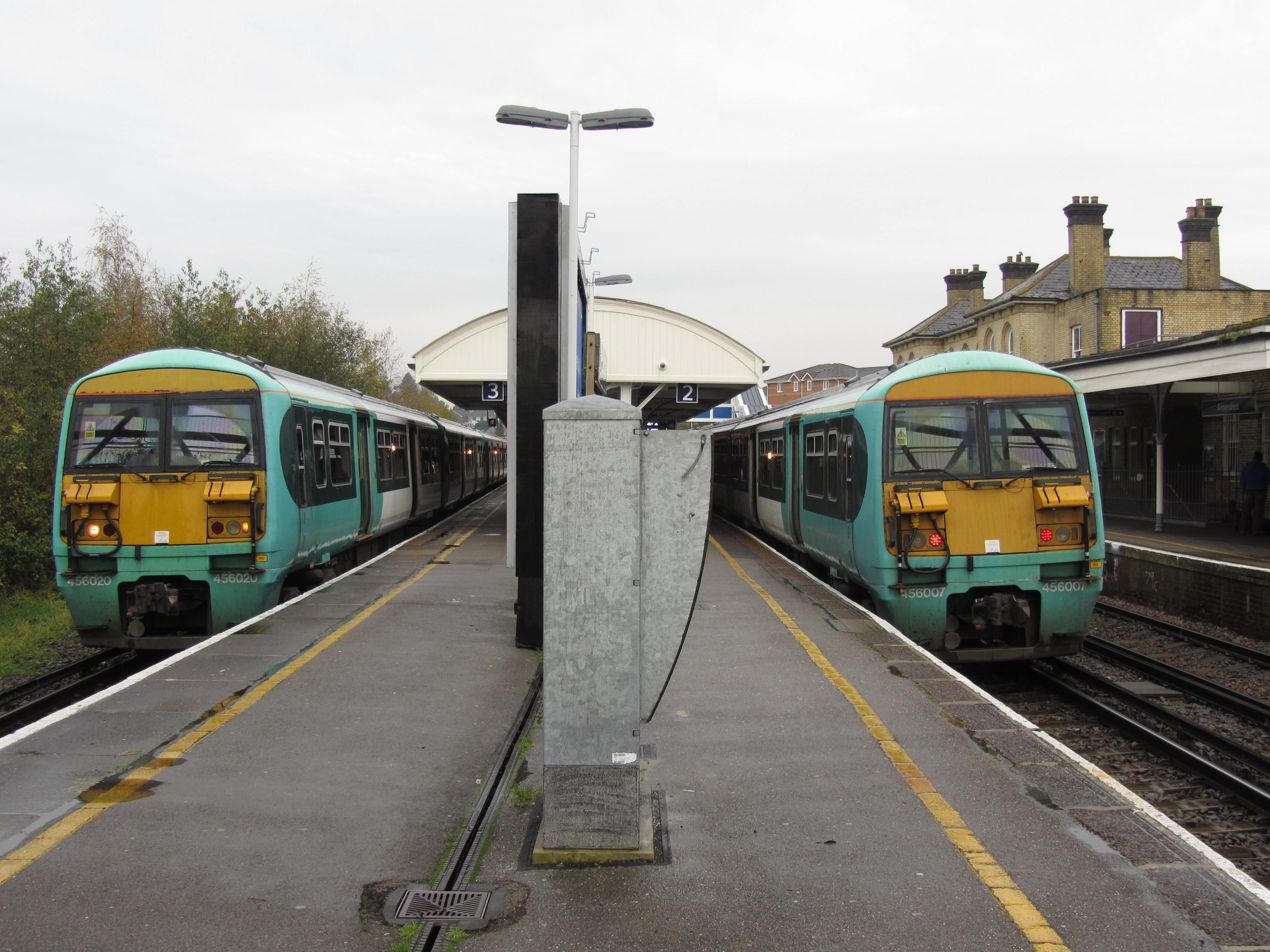
Class 456 units at Aldershot in November 2014: Although the units pictured are in a debranded Southern livery, they were operated by South West Trains at this point.

In February 2000, Class 458 units were deployed to the Alton line, initially running services to-and-from Waterloo via Woking. Class 456 units were introduced to the Alton line on 23 March 2014, when they began operating between Ascot and Guildford via Aldershot. Based at Wimbledon depot, the 2-carriage units regularly ran in pairs on this route. The Class 456s were withdrawn from passenger service by SWR on 15 January 2022.

Alton line trains are predominantly operated by Class 450 units, but Class 444 units are also scheduled to operate selected services. Class 701 units are expected to operate services north of Farnham.

== Freight ==
When the first part of the Alton line opened in 1849, a public freight yard was provided at Farnham station. It was used by local breweries that had previously transported their ale from Winchfield station on the South West Main Line. A public freight siding at Tongham was also provided from the outset, but the station there did not open until October 1856.

Construction of the Aldershot Gas Works was authorised by the Aldershot Gas and Water Act 1896. A 1 mi (1.6 km) branch from Tongham station was built to supply the facility with coal. Although the line to the gas works closed in the mid-1950s, goods trains carrying agricultural produce continued to run twice weekly from Tongham. The last freight train, carrying sugar beet, departed Tongham for Guildford on 31 December 1960. (Note: The goods facility at Ash Green Halt was closed on 1 December 1926.)

In 1903, a siding was installed at Weydon Lane for Thomas Patterson, a gravel merchant. The adjacent quarry was served by a 2 ft (610 mm) narrow-gauge railway. Much of the site was used for the construction of Farnham carriage shed in 1937, although the gravel siding continued in use until 1968. Spent ballast was sent for disposal at the site between 1934 and 1987.

The public goods yards began to close in the mid-20th century, with the withdrawal of facilities at Farnham on 4 May 1950, Bentley on 1 June 1964, Alton on 6 January 1969 and at Aldershot on 6 October 1975.

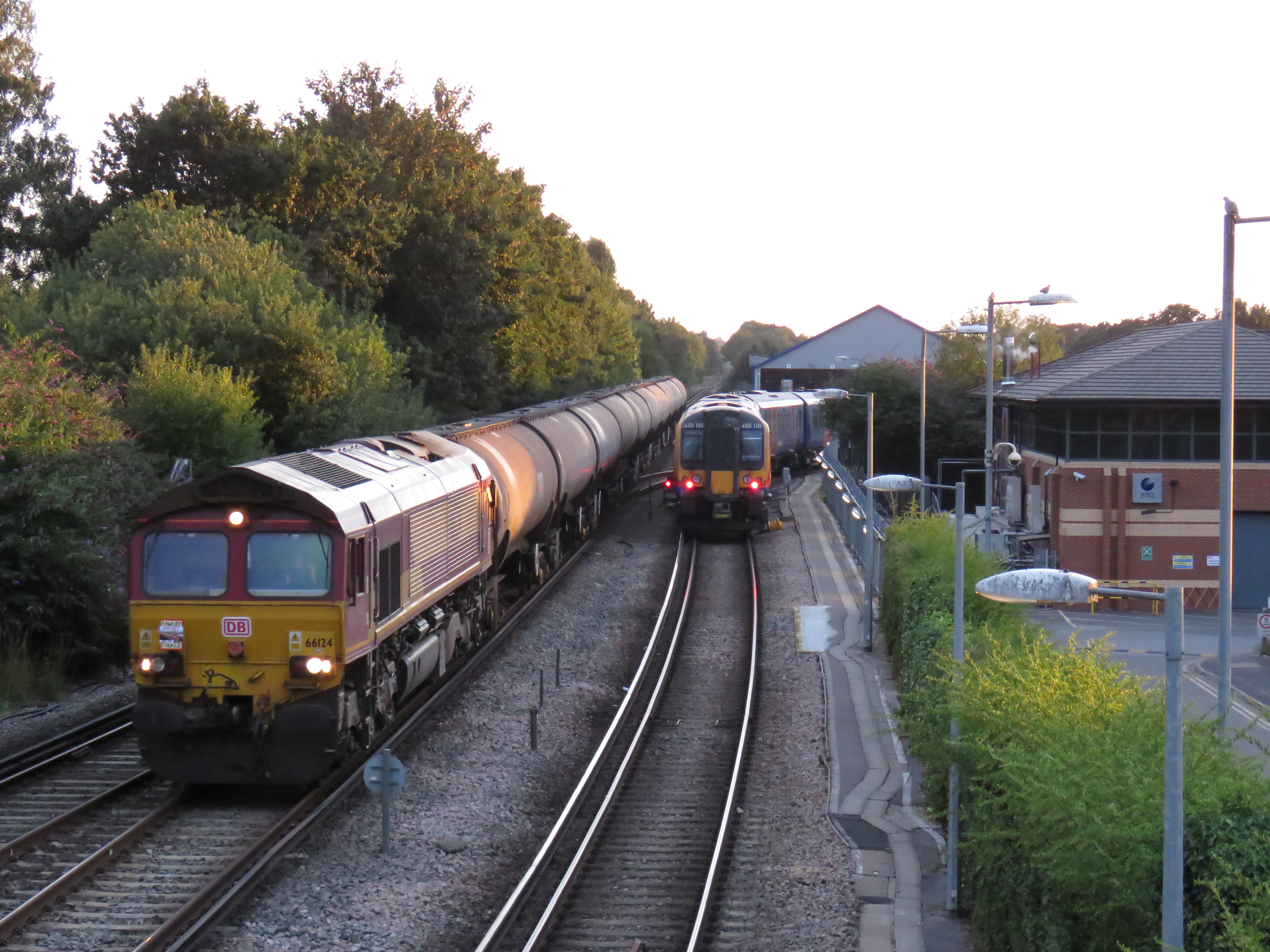
An oil train (left) passes Farnham Traction Depot in August 2016

Crude oil was discovered at the Humbly Grove Oil Field, the second-largest onshore oil field in the UK, in 1980. Starting on 4 June 1986 oil was transported in a pipeline to Holybourne Oil Terminal, between Bentley and Alton, where it was loaded into tankers and was taken by rail to Fawley Refinery. The oil train typically ran two or three times per week and reversed at Alton station to allow the diesel locomotive to run around. By the mid-2010s, the unloading equipment at the Fawley terminal was approaching the end of its working life and the decision was taken to discontinue the rail operation. The last oil train from the Holybourne terminal, hauled by a Class 66 locomotive, ran on 1 September 2016 and thereafter oil was transported from Humbly Grove by road tanker.

== Accidents and incidents ==
- 26 December 1901: A fireman was struck on the head and killed when his train to Waterloo passed under a low bridge shortly after leaving Farnham station. He had been working in the coal bunker of his locomotive.
- 12 July 1905: A track worker died after being struck by a train at Farnham Junction.
- 11 July 1925: A track worker died after being struck by a train at Farnham Junction.
- 22 August 1940: A train of 50 wagons, loaded with ammunition for the Royal Army Ordnance Corps, was bombed by an enemy aircraft at Tongham. One of the wagons caught fire, but was uncoupled by two railway workers, who moved the undamaged trucks away. The two men, George Leach and George Keen, were awarded the George Medal, and a development of 35 houses, built in the village in the early 2020s, was named "Victory Fields" in their honour.
- 10 May 1981: A man died after being struck by a train in Foxhills Tunnel. He had been attempting to hide from the police.
- 13 August 2006: A landslip at Foxhills Tunnel prevented trains from running between Brookwood and Ash Vale for five days.
- 13 April 2016: A landslip at Wrecclesham closed the line between Farnham and Alton. A temporary speed limit over the affected section had been imposed on 1 April. The embankment was stabilised and the line reopened on 4 May 2016. Later that year, the drainage of the affected site was improved and a retaining wall was constructed to reduce the risk of further landslips.

== Bibliography ==
- Baker, Michael (1987). The Waterloo to Weymouth Line. Wellingborough: Stephens. ISBN 978-0-85-059835-3.
- Beeching, Richard (27 March 1963a). The Reshaping of British Railways Part 1: Report. London: HMSO.
- Beeching, Richard (27 March 1963b). The Reshaping of British Railways Part 2: Maps. London: HMSO.
- Bridge, Mike, ed. (2017). TRACKatlas of Mainland Britain (3rd ed.). Sheffield: Platform 5. ISBN 978-1-90-943126-3.
- Brown, David; Jackson, Alan A. (1990). Network SouthEast Handbook. Harrow Weald: Capital Transport Publishing. ISBN 978-1-85-414129-3.
- Cooper, B.K.; Antell, Robert (1988). A Tribute to the London & South Western Railway. London: Ian Allan. ISBN 978-0-71-101780-1.
- Course, Edwin (1974). The Railways of Southern England: Secondary and Branch Lines. London: Batsford. ISBN 978-0-71-342835-3.
- Dart, Maurice (2014). Images of Kent, Surrey, Sussex & South London Railways. Wellington: Halsgrove. ISBN 978-0-85-704232-3.
- de Souza, Jeremy (2019). Railways around Hampshire. Stroud: Amberley Publishing. ISBN 978-1-44-568310-2.
- Ellis, C. Hamilton (1962). The South Western Railway: Its Mechanical History and Background, 1838-1922. London: George Allen & Unwin. OCLC 6119980.
- Ewbank Smith, William (1971). Victorian Farnham: The Story of a Surrey Town, 1837-1901. Chichester: Phillimore. ISBN 978-0-90-059230-0.
- Faulkner, J.N.; Williams, R.A. (1988). The LSWR in the 20th Century. Newton Abbot: David & Charles. ISBN 978-0-71-538927-0.
- Gough, Terry (2001). Hampshire: The North of the County. Rediscovering Railways. Kettering: Past & Present Publishing. ISBN 978-1-85-895167-6.
- Glover, John (1982). Southern England. Britain's Local Railways. Shepperton: Ian Allan. ISBN 978-0-71-101258-5.
- Hardingham, Roger (1995). The Mid-Hants Railway: From Construction to Closure. Cheltenham: Runpast Publishing. ISBN 978-1-87-075429-3.
- Hay, Peter (1986). Steaming through Surrey. Midhurst: Middleton Press. ISBN 978-0-90-652039-0.
- Jackson, Alan A. (1999). The Railway in Surrey. Penryn: Atlantic Transport Publishers. ISBN 978-0-90-689990-8.
- Jackson, Allen (2017). Signalling and Signal Boxes along the LSWR Routes. Stroud: Amberley Publishing. ISBN 978-1-44-566938-0.
- Jebens, Dieter (1996). Guide to the Basingstoke Canal. Mytchett: Basingstoke Canal Authority.
- Kidner, R.W. (1974). The Reading to Tonbridge Line. Headington: Oakwood Press. ISBN 978-0-85-361156-1.
- Maggs, Colin G. (2010). The Branch Lines of Hampshire. Stroud: Amberley Publishing. ISBN 978-1-84-868343-3.
- Maggs, Colin (2012). Hampshire Railways: The History of Steam. Newbury: Countryside Books. ISBN 978-1-84-674296-5.
- Marsden, Colin J. (2008). The DC Electrics. Hersham: Ian Allan. ISBN 978-0-86-093615-2.
- Mitchell, Vic; Smith, Keith (1984). Branch Lines to Alton. Midhurst: Middleton Press. ISBN 978-0-90-652011-6.
- Mitchell, Vic; Smith, Keith (1988). Woking to Alton. Midhurst: Middleton Press. ISBN 978-0-90-652059-8.
- Quick, Michael (2023) [2001]. Railway Passenger Stations in Great Britain (PDF) (5.05 ed.). London: Railway and Canal Historical Society.
- Robertson, Kevin (2008). Southern Scene. Hersham: Ian Allan. ISBN 978-0-71-103339-9.
- Robertson, Kevin; Oppitz, Leslie (1988). Hampshire Railways Remembered. Newbury: Countryside Books. ISBN 978-0-90-539293-6.
- Vickers, Paul H. (2017). Aldershot's Military Heritage. Stroud: Amberley Publishing. ISBN 978-1-44-566590-0.
- Welch, Michael (2003). A Southern Electric Album. Harrow Weald: Capital Transport. ISBN 978-1-85-414270-2.
- Williams, R. A. (1968). The London & South Western Railway. Vol. 1: The Formative Years. Newton Abbot: David & Charles. ISBN 978-0-71-534188-9.
- Williams, R. A. (1973). The London & South Western Railway. Vol. 2: Growth and Consolidation. Newton Abbot: David & Charles. ISBN 978-0-71-535940-2.
- Wragg, David (2003). The Southern Railway Handbook: 1923–1947. Stroud: Sutton Publishing Ltd. ISBN 978-0-75-093294-3.
- "Kent / Sussex / Wessex Routes Sectional Appendix" (PDF). Network Rail. 2009.
- "Delivering a better railway for a better Britain | Route Specifications: Wessex" (PDF). Network Rail. 2016.
- "Delivering a better railway for a better Britain | Network Specification: Wessex" (PDF). Network Rail. 2016.
