= Tongham railway station =

Former English railway station

Coordinates: 51.2340°N 0.7321°W

Tongham
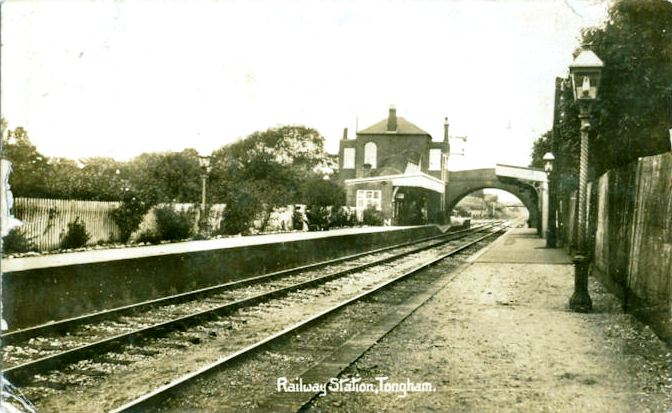

General information
- Location: Tongham, Guildford, Surrey; England
- Platforms: 2

Other information
- Status: Disused

History
- Pre-grouping: London and South Western Railway
- Post-grouping: Southern Railway; Southern Region of British Railways

Key dates
- 1856: Opened
- 4 July 1937: Closed for passengers
- 31 December 1960: closed for freight
Location

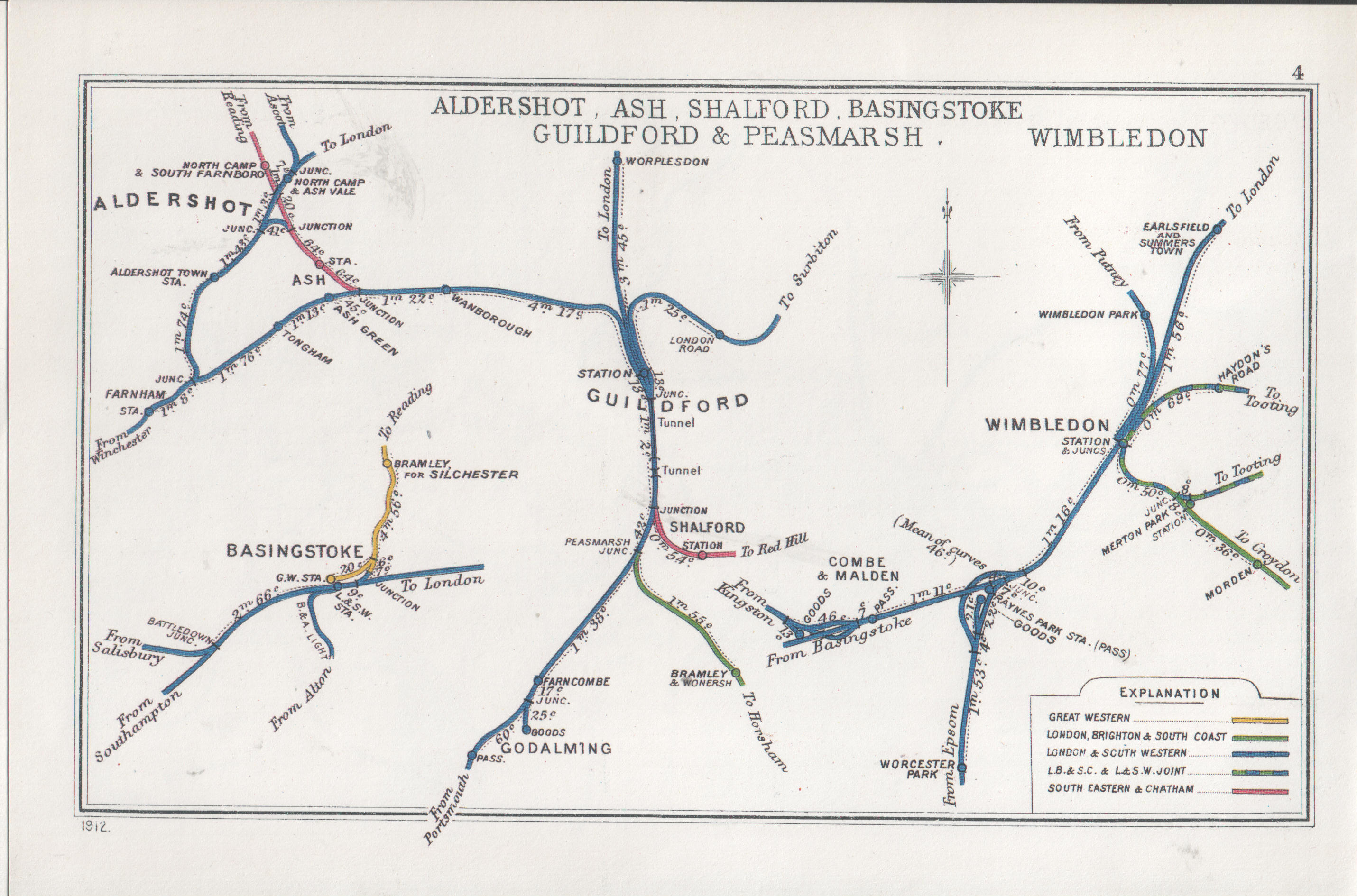
A 1912 Railway Clearing House map of lines around Tongham railway station

Tongham railway station was a railway station serving the village of Tongham, Guildford, Surrey in England which opened in 1856 and closed in 1937.

== History ==
The station was opened in 1856 by the London and South Western Railway (LSWR) as one of two intermediate stops on a now-closed section of the LSWR's Guildford to Alton line.

Architecturally, Tongham station was similar to Ash Green Halt in that the main station building was situated at street level on a road bridge crossing the line, with a covered staircase leading down to the Up platform. The station was equipped with two platforms, with several sidings to the east of the station as well as the line to the Gas Works which led off to the north-west from the Up line; a short siding also led into Hyde's dog biscuit factory situated to the west of the station.

Tongham station, along with Farnborough (Main), was one of the first railheads for the military traffic associated with the recently established army camps at Aldershot. Its significance was drastically reduced, both as a station and as part of a through route, with the opening of Aldershot railway station in 1870 on a new more direct line from Pirbright Junction on the London to Basingstoke line which linked with the Guildford to Alton line between Tongham and Farnham, effectively bypassing the short section. This was followed in 1879 by the laying of a spur from Ash to Aldershot which had the effect of diminishing the Guildford to Farnham traffic.

Although a short branch was laid from Tongham to serve the nearby Aldershot Gas Works in 1898, the line became a forgotten byway and was singled in 1930. Passenger services ceased in 1937 as a consequence of electrification of other lines in the vicinity, but Tongham remained open to serve the Gas Works until its closure in 1954. With the closure of the Gas Works, British Railways decided that the twice-weekly goods service was no longer justified and the last service ran on 31 December 1960.

The station has been demolished and the course of the line to the west is largely taken up by the A331 "Blackwater Valley Relief Road" which links the A31 Hogs Back Road with the M3 motorway. A footpath passes to the west of the station. The road bridge which crossed the former railway line was demolished in 1994.

Preceding station	Disused railways	Following station
Ash Green Halt	British Railways; Southern Region; Tongham Railway	Farnham
