= Ash Green Halt railway station =

Disused railway station in Ash Green, Guildford

Coordinates: 51.242283°N 0.709414°W

Ash Green Halt
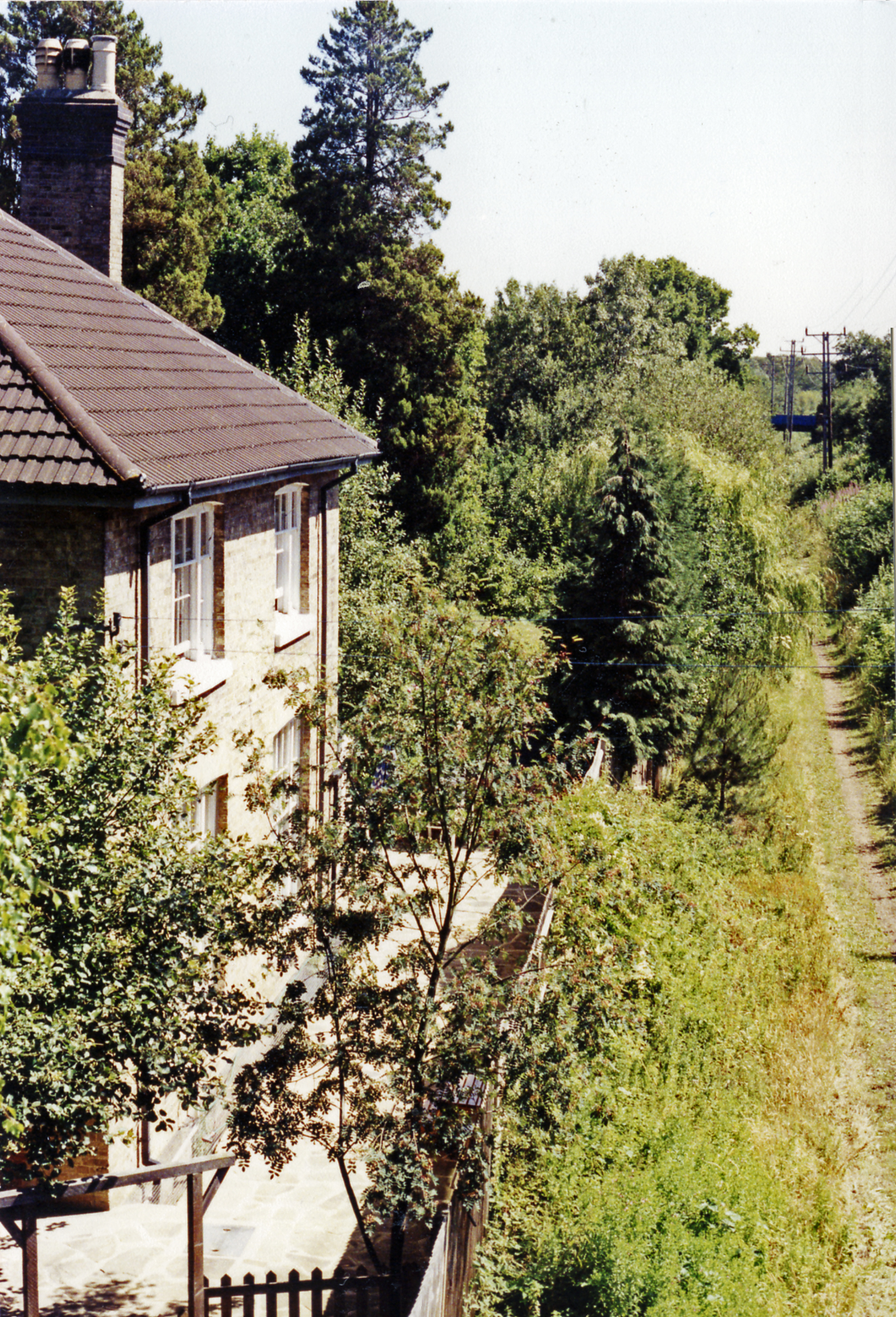
- The site of the station in 1990

General information
- Location: Ash Green, Guildford; England
- Grid reference: SU902501
- Platforms: 2

Other information
- Status: Disused

History
- Pre-grouping: London and South Western Railway
- Post-grouping: Southern Railway

Key dates
- 8 October 1849: Station opens as Ash
- December 1876: Station renamed Ash Green
- September 1891: Station renamed Ash
- 1 October 1895: Station renamed Ash Green
- 1 December 1926: Station renamed Ash Green Halt
- 4 July 1937: Station closed
Location

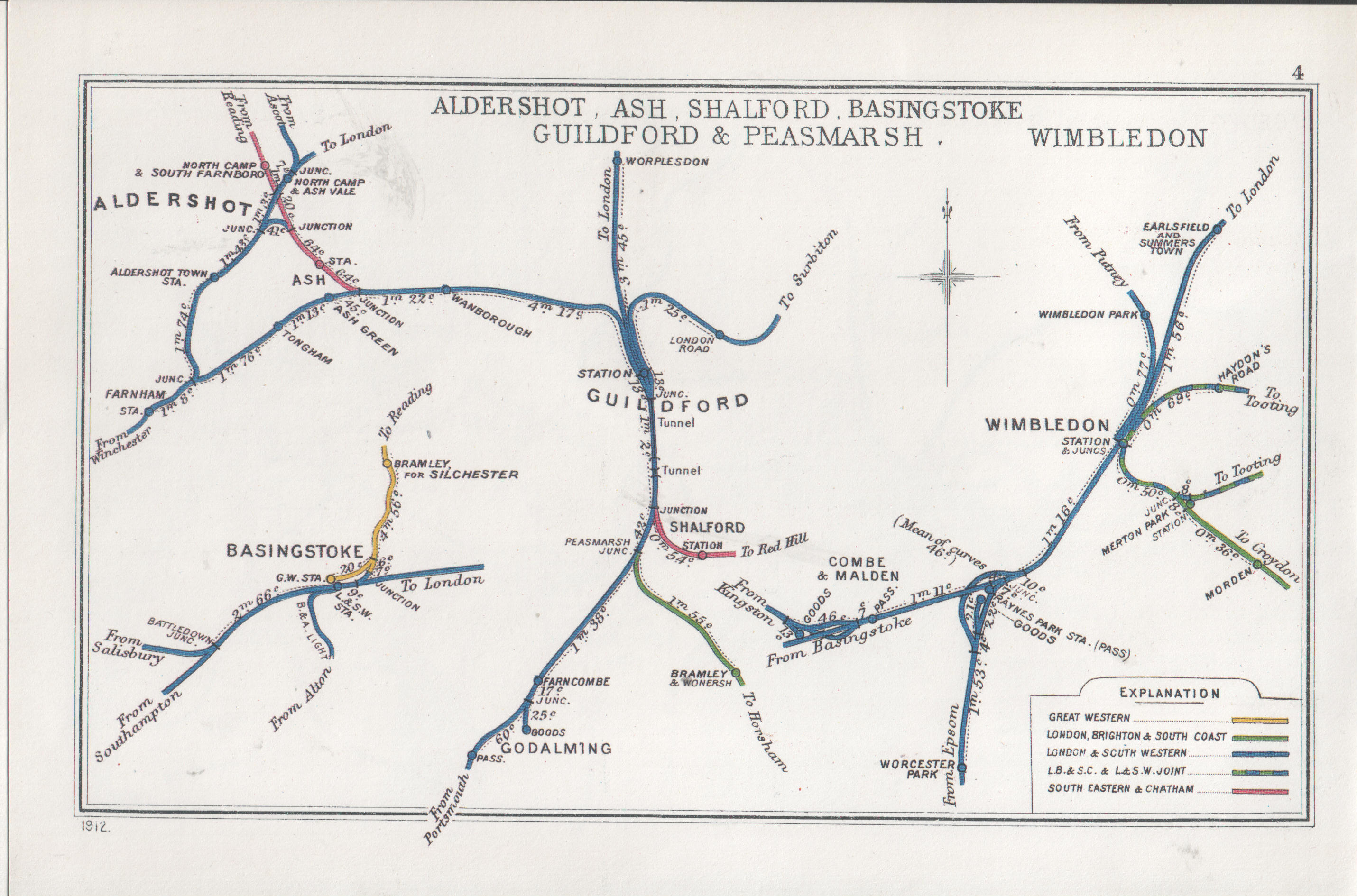
A 1912 Railway Clearing House map of lines around Ash Green Halt railway station

Ash Green Halt railway station known for a time as Ash Green, served the village of Ash, Surrey in England on the original route of the Alton Line which ran from London via the town of Guildford to the east.

== History ==
The London and South Western Railway opened the station in 1849 as a halt (request stop) between Guildford railway station and Farnham railway station before the opening of the shorter route with a line off the South West Main Line to the north from London via Aldershot to Farnham. As a result of the 1923 Grouping, the LS&WR became part of the new Southern Railway, which closed Ash Green in 1937.

The station was renamed several times, alternating between Ash and Ash Green, with the suffix added in 1926.

The station building is now a private house, along with the Up platform.

Preceding station	Disused railways	Following station
Wanborough	Southern Railway; Alton Line (Tongham branch)	Tongham
