= Ash railway station =

Railway station in Surrey, England

Coordinates: 51.250°N 0.713°W

Ash
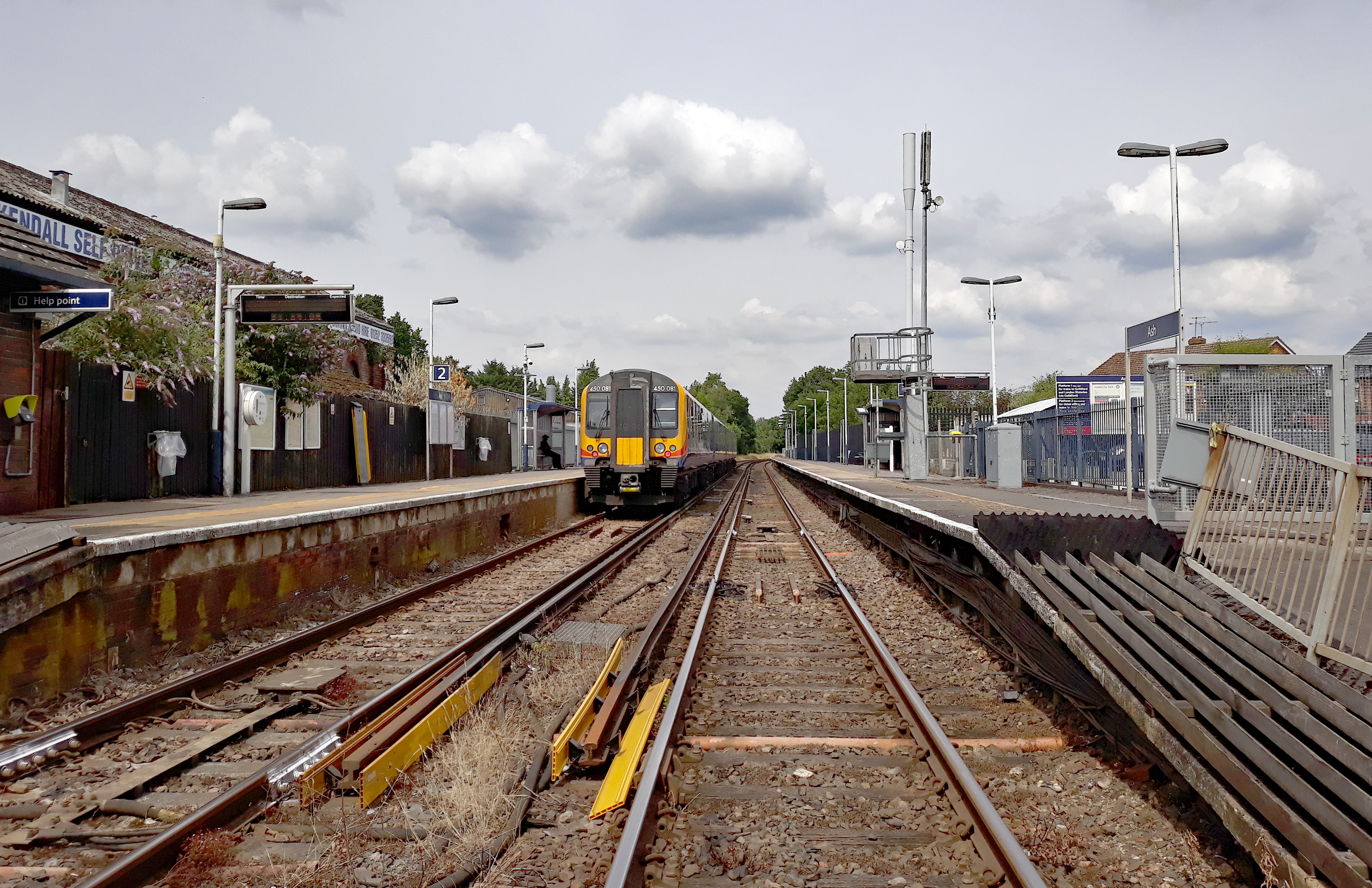
- Ash railway station

General information
- Location: Ash, Guildford; England
- Grid reference: SU899508
- Manager: South Western Railway
- Platforms: 2

Other information
- Station code: ASH
- Classification: DfT category E

Key dates
- 20 August 1849: Opened as Ash
- July 1855: Renamed Ash and Aldershot
- September 1858: Renamed Aldershot (Ash)
- June 1859: Renamed Ash and Aldershot
- June 1863: Renamed Ash Junction
- 1 December 1926: Renamed Ash

Passengers
- 2020/21: ▼67,150
- Interchange: ▼7,209
- 2021/22: ▲0.160 million
- Interchange: ▲19,266
- 2022/23: ▲0.204 million
- Interchange: ▲32,638
- 2023/24: ▲0.233 million
- Interchange: ▲36,416
- 2024/25: ▲0.259 million
- Interchange: ▲43,911
Location
Notes
- Passenger statistics from the Office of Rail and Road

Ash railway station serves the village of Ash, in Surrey, England. The station is served by South Western Railway, which manages the station, and by Great Western Railway. It is situated on the Ascot to Guildford line and the North Downs Line, 36 miles 34 chains (58.6 km) from London Waterloo.

== History ==
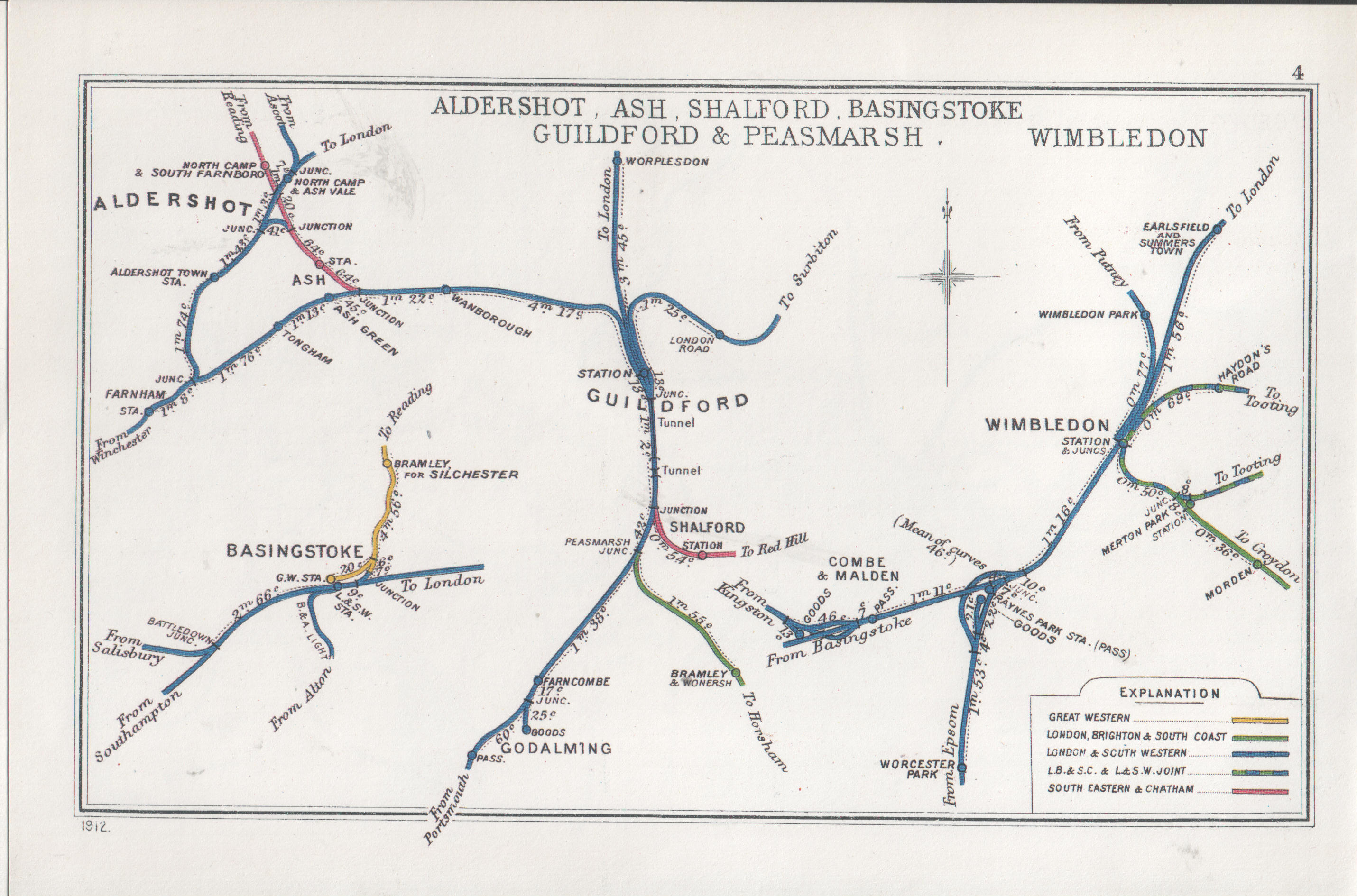
A 1912 Railway Clearing House map of lines around Ash railway station

Ash station was opened by the Reading, Guildford and Reigate Railway, then operated by the South Eastern Railway. The London and South Western Railway had running powers over this section of line, to North Camp, but it had never used them. After the construction of the direct line from Pirbright Junction, the LSWR built a spur to Aldershot, part of the lines to Alton, enabling its trains to call at Ash station.

The South Eastern Railway became part of the Southern Railway during the Grouping of 1923. The station then passed on to the Southern Region of British Railways on nationalisation in 1948.

The station had four platforms when it was built, which were later reduced to two after the Second World War. The other two platforms were where the station car park and Network Rail offices now stand. The station is 49 miles 18 chains (79.2 km) from Charing Cross (measured via Redhill); platform 1 can accommodate an eight-coach train, but platform 2 only accommodates four coaches. To the west is the former Ash Junction, 48 miles 34 chains (77.9 km) from Charing Cross, where the former route via Tongham left the North Downs Line 35 miles 50 chains (57.3 km) from London Waterloo (via Worplesdon and milepost 30 1/4 at Guildford).

When sectorisation was introduced in the 1980s, the station was served by Network SouthEast until the privatisation of British Rail.

Construction of a new road bridge to replace the A323 level crossing at the south-eastern end of the station, began in September 2023.

== Services ==
The typical off-peak service is:

- Two trains per hour in each direction between Guildford and Farnham via Aldershot, operated by South Western Railway
- One train per hour in each direction between Reading and Gatwick Airport via Guildford, operated by Great Western Railway. During peak hours, the service is increased to two trains per hour in each direction.

Services are operated by Classes 165 and 166 diesel multiple units and Class 450 electric multiple units.

Preceding station	National Rail	Following station
Wanborough	South Western Railway; Farnham to Guildford	Aldershot
Guildford	Great Western Railway North Downs Line	North Camp
Wanborough Limited Service	Great Western Railway North Downs Line	North Camp
