= Farnham railway station =

Railway station in Surrey, England

Coordinates: 51°12′43″N 0°47′31″W

Farnham
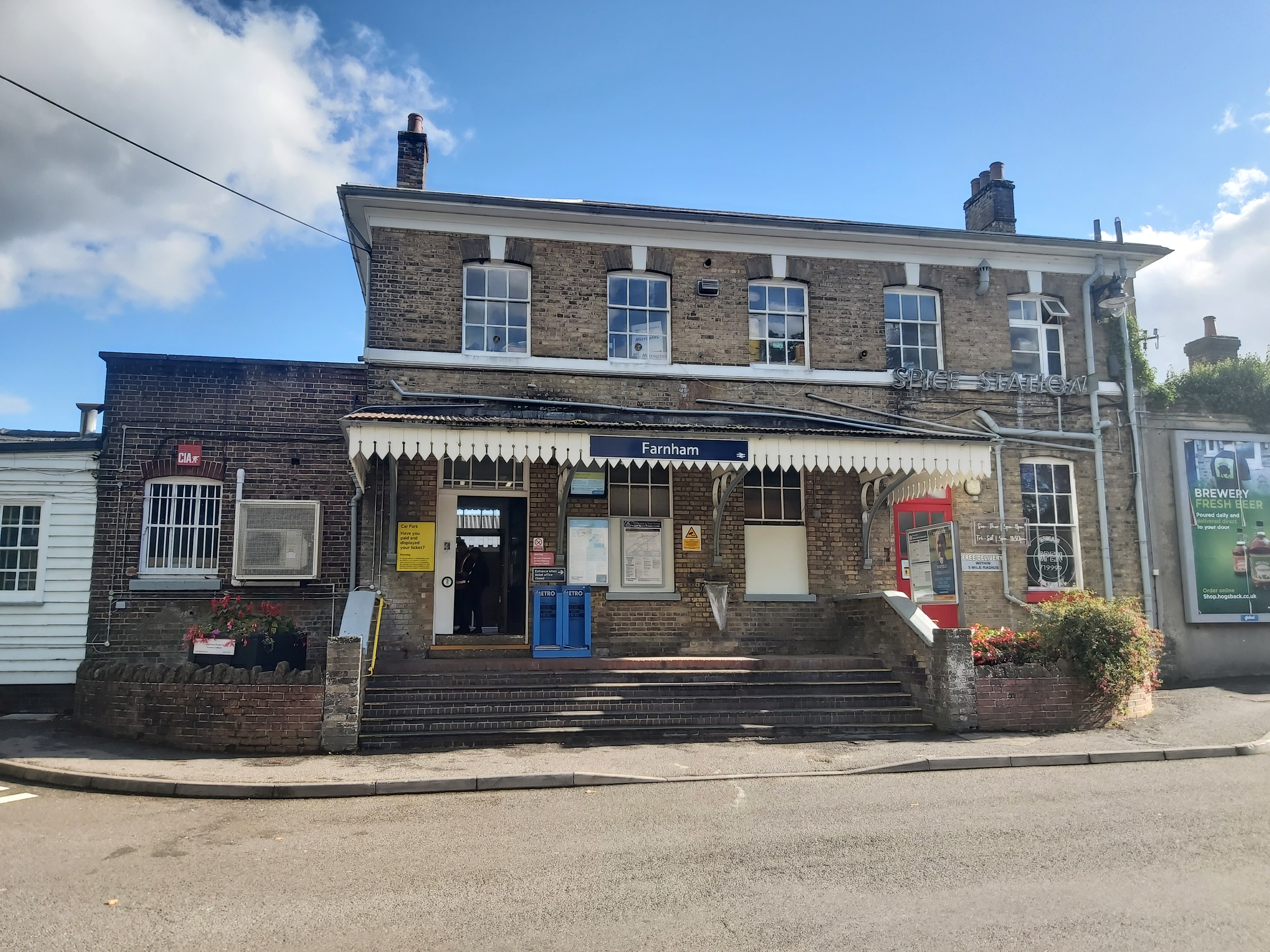

General information
- Location: Farnham, Waverley; England
- Grid reference: SU844465
- Manager: South Western Railway
- Platforms: 2

Other information
- Station code: FNH
- Classification: DfT category C2

History
- Opened: 8 October 1849

Passengers
- 2020/21: ▼0.274 million
- Interchange: ▼6,252
- 2021/22: ▲0.931 million
- Interchange: ▲16,977
- 2022/23: ▲1.203 million
- Interchange: ▲21,176
- 2023/24: ▲1.377 million
- Interchange: ▲24,565
- 2024/25: ▲1.494 million
- Interchange: ▲28,809
Location
Notes
- Passenger statistics from the Office of Rail and Road

Farnham railway station serves the town of Farnham in Surrey, England. It is a stop on the Alton line, with services between Alton, Aldershot, Woking, Clapham Junction and London Waterloo; two branch lines also provide services to Ascot and Guildford. South Western Railway manages the station and operates all services. Immediately to the north of the station, the railway crosses Station Hill, the B3001, via a level crossing, one of the most misused crossings in the Network Rail Wessex Region.

== History ==
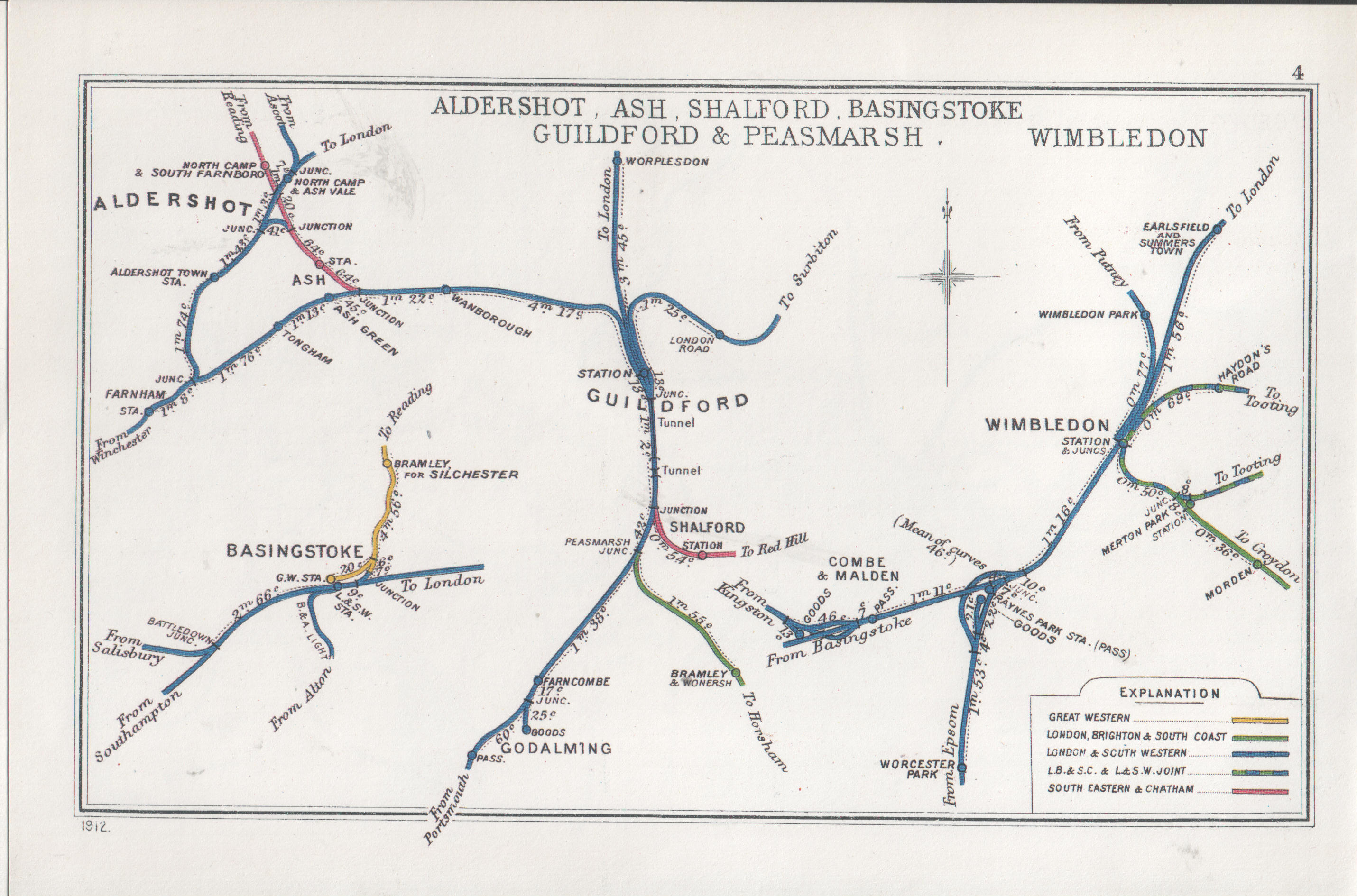
A 1912 Railway Clearing House map of lines around Farnham station

The station was opened on 8 October 1849, on a route from Guildford via Ash Green Halt and Tongham. The line from Aldershot station opened in 1870 and was electrified on 4 July 1937. Passenger services via Ash Green Halt and Tongham ceased on the same date.

== Facilities ==
There is a buffet in the booking hall, a ticket office, ticket machines and spaces for 134 bicycles. The station car park has 558 spaces;it was expanded with the addition of a dual-level car park facility, including better lighting, security cameras and improved entrance.

== Services ==
All services at Farnham are operated by South Western Railway using Class 450 electric multiple units.

The typical off-peak service in trains per hour is:

- 2 tph to London Waterloo via Woking
- 2 tph to Alton
- 2 tph to Guildford

The station is also served by two early morning services to London Waterloo that run via Ascot and Staines instead of Woking.

On Sundays, the service to Guildford do not run and the services between London Waterloo and Alton are reduced to hourly.

Preceding station	National Rail	Following station
Aldershot	South Western Railway Alton Line	Bentley or Alton
Aldershot	South Western Railway; Farnham to Guildford	Terminus
	Former services	
Tongham	British Railways; Southern Region; Tongham Railway	Terminus

== Connections ==
Stagecoach South bus routes 5, 16, 18, 19 and 46 link the station with Aldershot, Guildford and surrounding villages.

== In literature ==
Sherlock Holmes and Doctor Watson travelled by train to Farnham in The Adventure of the Solitary Cyclist. Holmes said, "A beautiful neighbourhood and full of the most interesting associations. You remember, Watson, that it was near there that we took Archie Stamford, the forger." Watson recounted, "We had ascertained from the lady that she went down upon the Monday by the train which leaves Waterloo at 9.50, so I started early and caught the 9:13." He did this on Monday 25 April 1895.

Sherlock Holmes, as a young boy, also lived in the Farnham area with his aunt and uncle in Andrew Lane's Young Sherlock Holmes series of books. The station features prominently as Holmes, his friend, and his tutor often travel by train to London Waterloo when they are going to visit Holmes's brother Mycroft.
