= Aldershot railway station =

Railway station in Hampshire, England

Aldershot
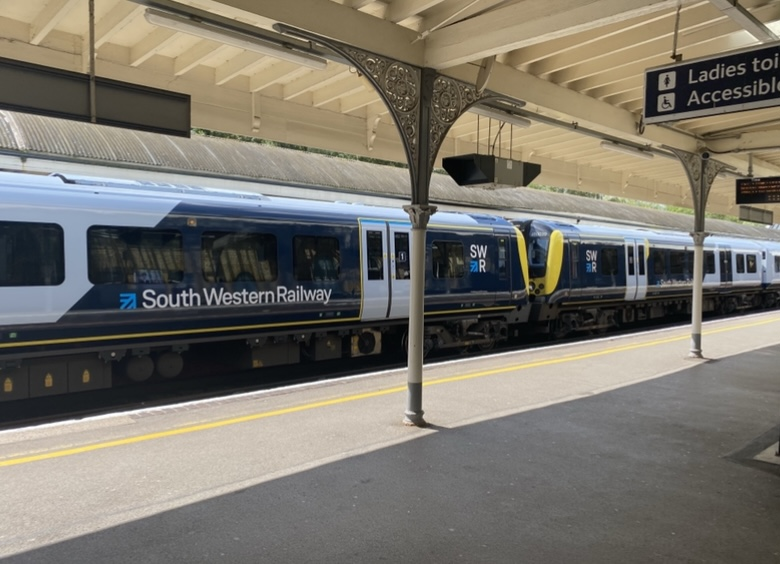
- A pair of Class 450s at the station, 2020

General information
- Location: Aldershot, Rushmoor, England
- Coordinates: 51°14′47″N 0°45′36″W
- Grid reference: SU866504
- Manager: South Western Railway
- Platforms: 3

Other information
- Station code: AHT
- Classification: DfT category C2

History
- Opened: 2 May 1870

Passengers
- 2020/21: ▼0.365 million
- Interchange: ▼20,033
- 2021/22: ▲0.888 million
- Interchange: ▲61,281
- 2022/23: ▲1.093 million
- Interchange: ▲79,583
- 2023/24: ▲1.229 million
- Interchange: ▲91,915
- 2024/25: ▲1.371 million
- Interchange: ▲0.105 million
Location
Notes
- Passenger statistics from the Office of Rail and Road

Aldershot railway station is located near to the town centre of Aldershot, in Hampshire, England. It lies on the Alton Line, 35 miles (56 km) down the line from London Waterloo. South Western Railway manages the station and provides all services.

== History ==
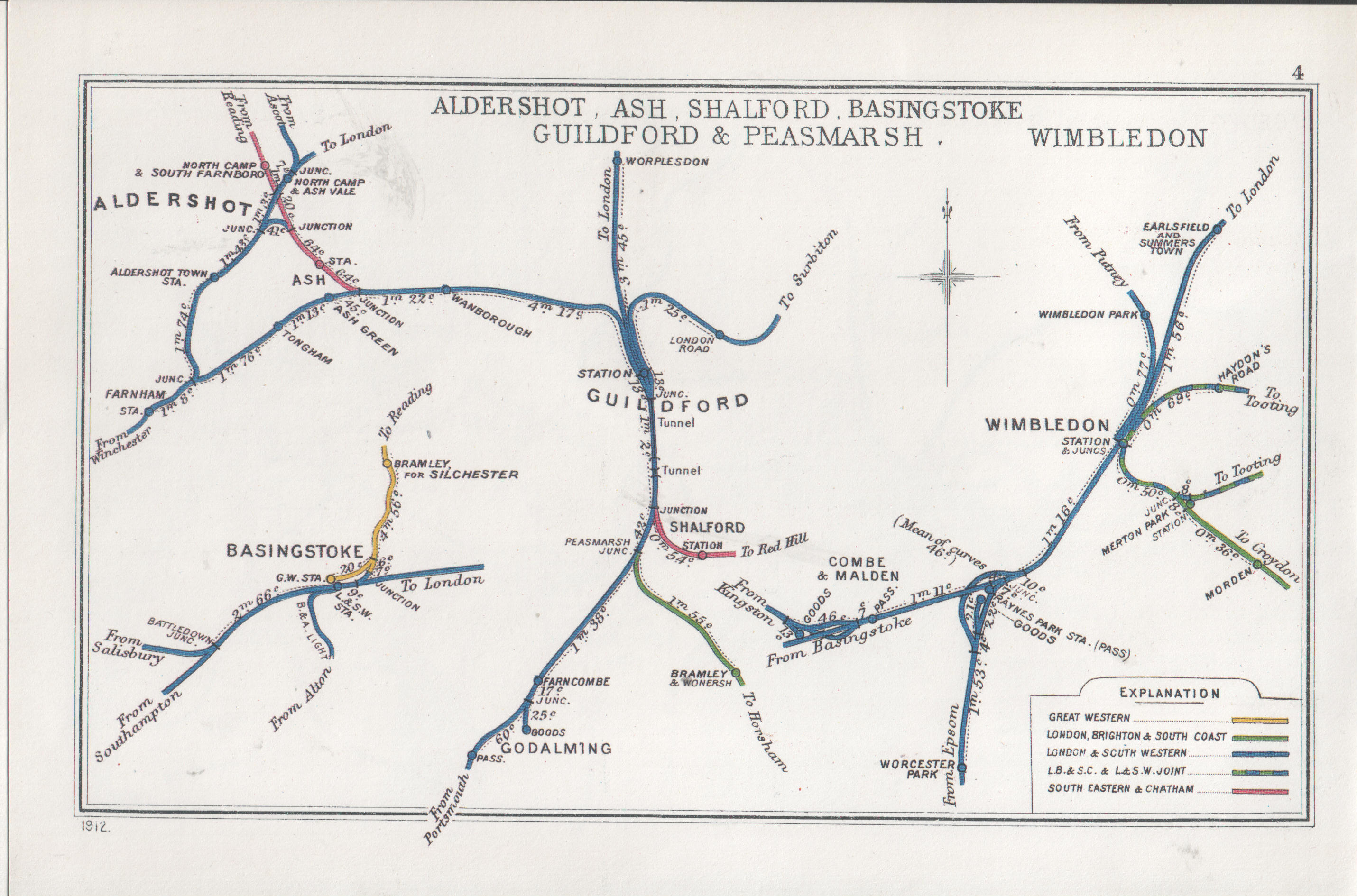
A 1912 Railway Clearing House map of lines around Aldershot

The London and South Western Railway opened the station in 1870. It became part of the Southern Railway in the 1923 Grouping. The station then passed to the Southern Region of British Railways on nationalisation in 1948.

Network SouthEast operated and served the station after British Rail was sectorised in 1982. South West Trains operated and served the station since the privatisation of British Rail in 1996 until 2017.

== Layout and facilities ==
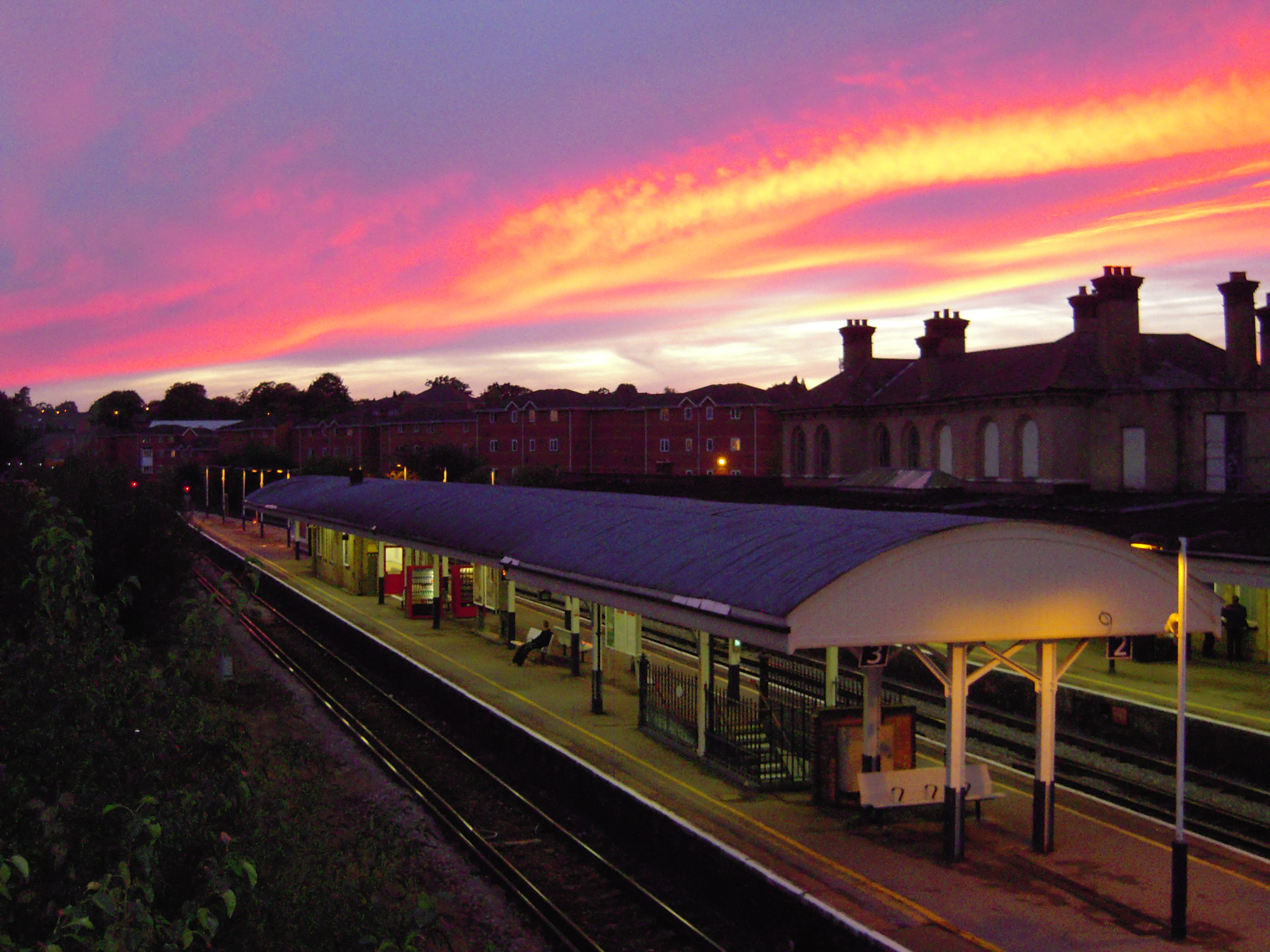
An evening view of the station, showing (from left to right) platforms 3, 2 and 1, October 2010

The station has three platforms:

- Platform 1, which is served by trains towards Woking and London Waterloo; the station entrance and ticket office is sited here
- Platforms 2 and 3 are generally served by Alton and Ascot-bound trains respectively; the tracks are signalled for bi-directional operation.

Platforms 2 and 3 are reached by way of the original subway and a more recently covered footbridge. Lifts are incorporated into the footbridge for step-free access.

There are two ticket vending machines, which are located outside the entrance to the booking hall.

== Services ==
The typical off-peak service from the station on Mondays to Saturdays, in trains per hour (tph), is:

- 2 tph to London Waterloo
- 2 tph to Alton
- 2 tph to Guildford
- 2 tph to Ascot
- 2 tph to Farnham.

Services are operated using four, eight or twelve car Class 450 electric multiple units.

Trains are usually routed to London Waterloo via Woking, with three services in the morning peak scheduled to go the longer, slower route via Ascot; this is included as part of the normal Aldershot to Ascot service. Two services return on this route in the evening.

Preceding station	National Rail	Following station
Ash Vale	South Western Railway; Alton Line	Farnham
Ash	South Western Railway; Farnham to Guildford	Farnham
Ash Vale	South Western Railway; Ascot to Aldershot	Terminus

== Gallery ==
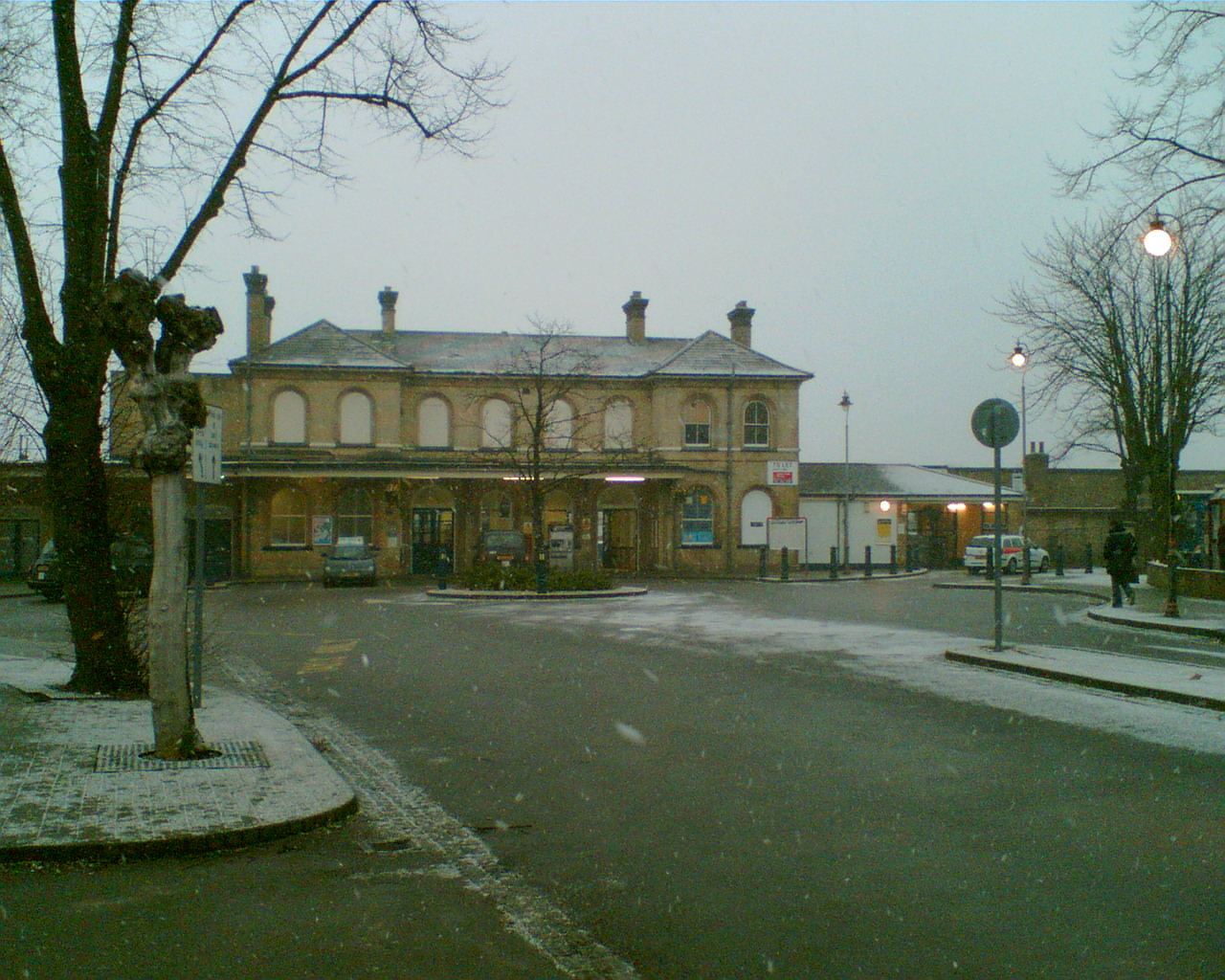
The station in the snow, January 2007.

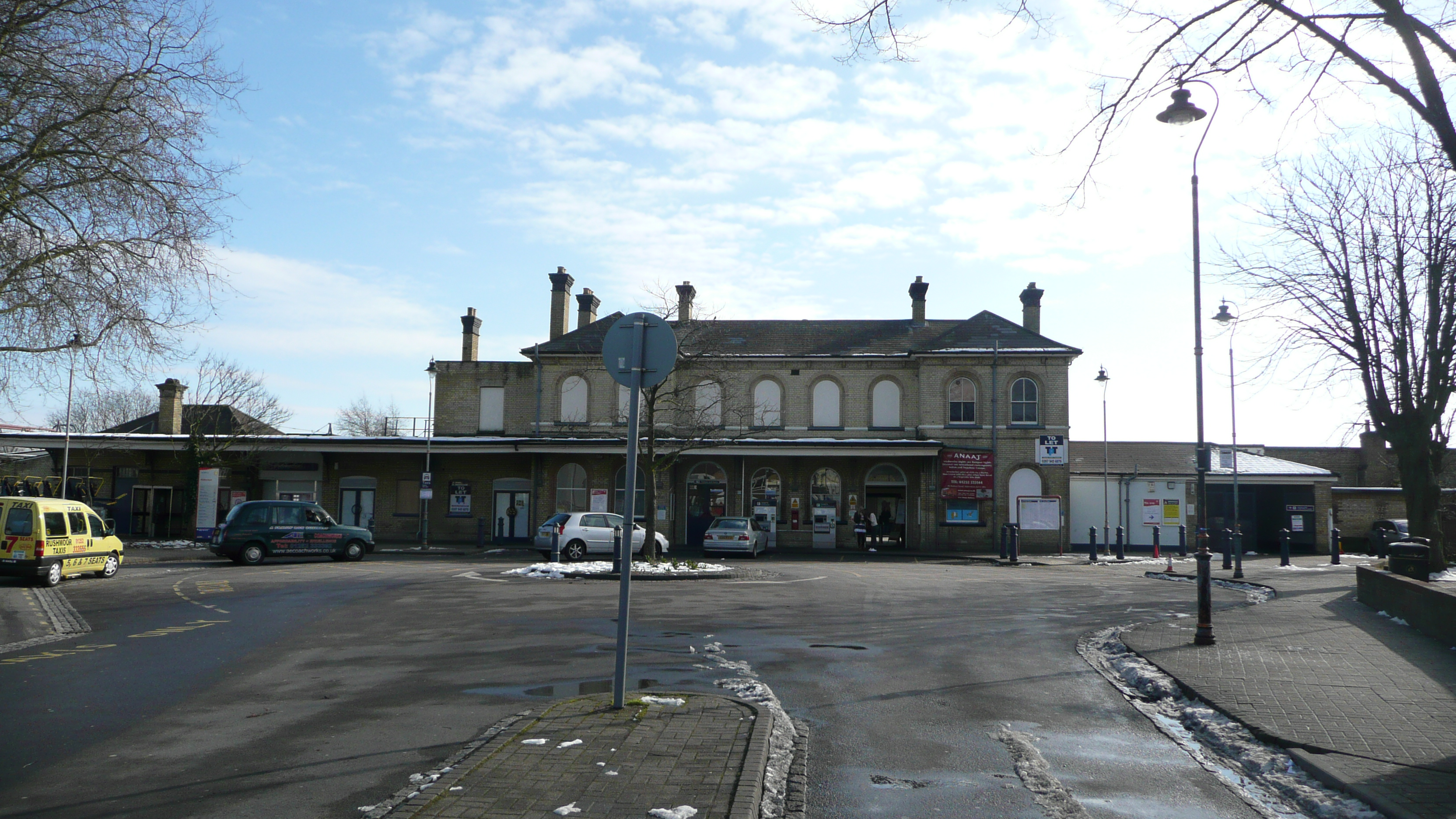
The exterior of the station, February 2009.
