= Farnborough railway station =

Farnborough railway station may refer to:

- Farnborough (Main) railway station
- Farnborough North railway station
