= Crowthorne railway station =

Railway station in Berkshire, England

Coordinates: 51.367°N 0.819°W

Crowthorne
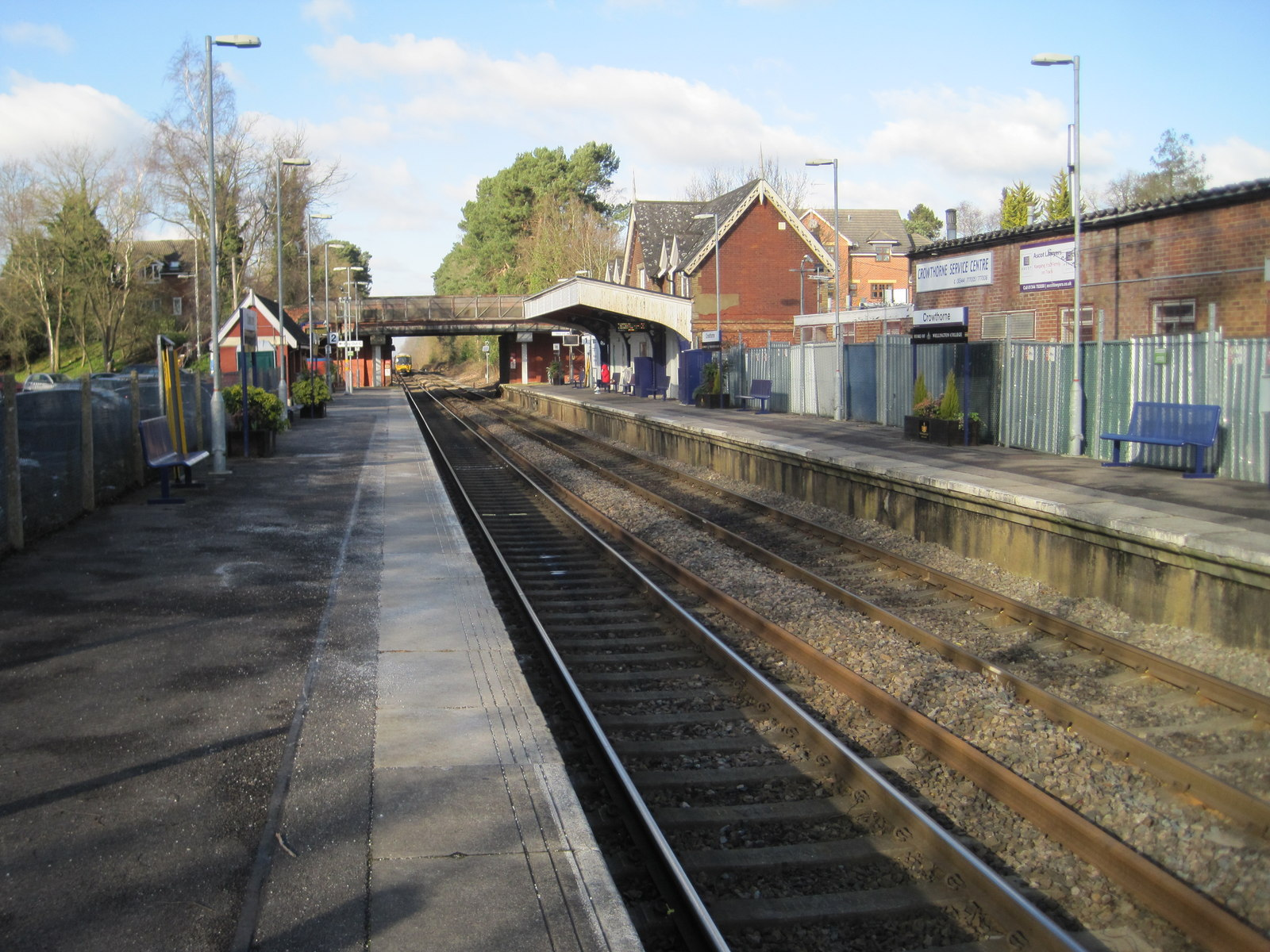

General information
- Location: Crowthorne, Bracknell Forest, England
- Grid reference: SU822637
- Manager: Great Western Railway
- Platforms: 2

Other information
- Station code: CRN
- Classification: DfT category E

Key dates
- 29 January 1859: Opened as Wellington College for Crowthorne
- 17 June 1928: Renamed Crowthorne

Passengers
- 2020/21: ▼61,142
- 2021/22: ▲0.151 million
- 2022/23: ▲0.191 million
- 2023/24: ▲0.215 million
- 2024/25: ▲0.248 million
Location
Notes
- Passenger statistics from the Office of Rail and Road

Crowthorne railway station serves Crowthorne, in Berkshire, England. It is managed by Great Western Railway, which operates services on the North Downs Line between Reading, Guildford, Redhill and Gatwick Airport. It is located 1.2 miles (2 km) from Crowthorne High Street, where most of the village's shops are located.

== History ==
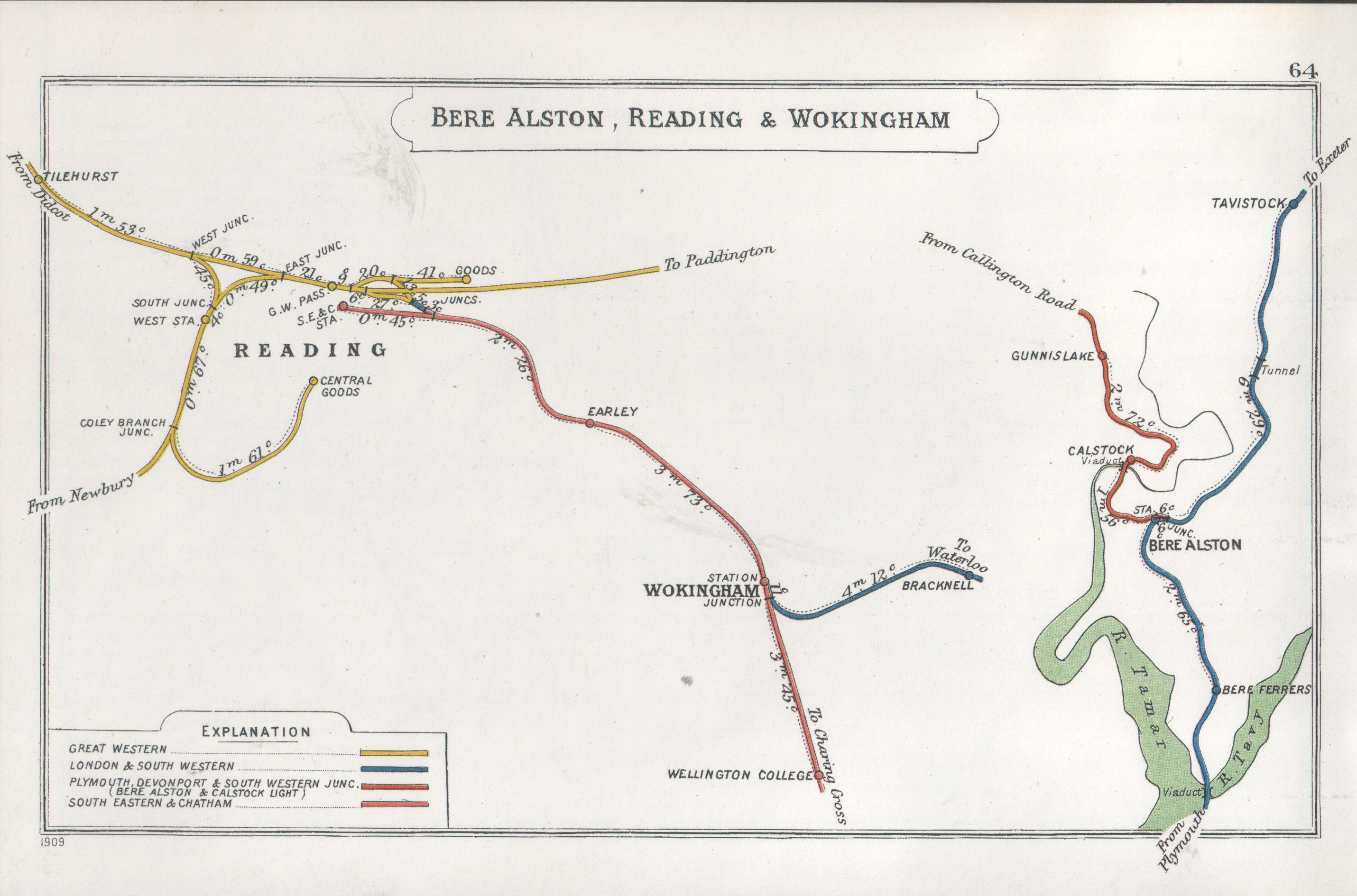
A 1909 Railway Clearing House map showing lines around Reading

Crowthorne station was opened in 1859, as a result of pressure from the governors of Wellington College on the directors of the South Eastern Railway. The college contributed £500 towards the cost of building the station, which was originally named Wellington College for Crowthorne; this remained until 1928, when it became Crowthorne. The old name board remained until World War II, although it was only removed to prevent invading parachutists knowing where they were.

The station building fell into disuse after destaffing came in 1967, whilst the goods facilities had ceased in 1964. In 1986-87, the station atmosphere was rejuvenated when the bus stop-style shelter on platform 2 was replaced by a new waiting shelter with the BR logo incorporated in blue (later red) bricks; this was done as part of a job-creation scheme. The original station building at the time served as premises for an electrical contractor and, later, a salon.

The building has been empty since 2018 and is deteriorating. The shelter was altered slightly in later years to include a small ticket office, which is staffed in the morning peak hours. In 2013, the station was beautified with murals painted by students at local schools and patients at nearby Broadmoor Hospital; signage for Wellington College was once again added. The station is due to be refurbished in 2026 or 2027, although there is no known date for the works to be completed.

== Facilities ==
The station has two platforms, which are both step-free and accessible:

1. for services towards Gatwick Airport
2. for services towards Reading.

The ticket office is open on weekdays between 6:45 and 10:30. There is a car park with 42 spaces and bicycle racks on both platforms.

== Services ==
All services at Crowthorne are operated by Great Western Railway using Classes 165 and 166 diesel multiple units.

The typical off-peak service is one train per hour in each direction between Reading and Gatwick Airport, via Guildford. During peak hours, the service is increased to two trains per hour in each direction. On Sundays, eastbound services run only as far as Redhill.

| Preceding station | National Rail | Following station |
|---|---|---|
| Sandhurst | Great Western Railway North Downs Line | Wokingham |
