= Chilworth railway station =

Railway station in Surrey, England

Coordinates: 51°12′54″N 0°31′30″W

Chilworth
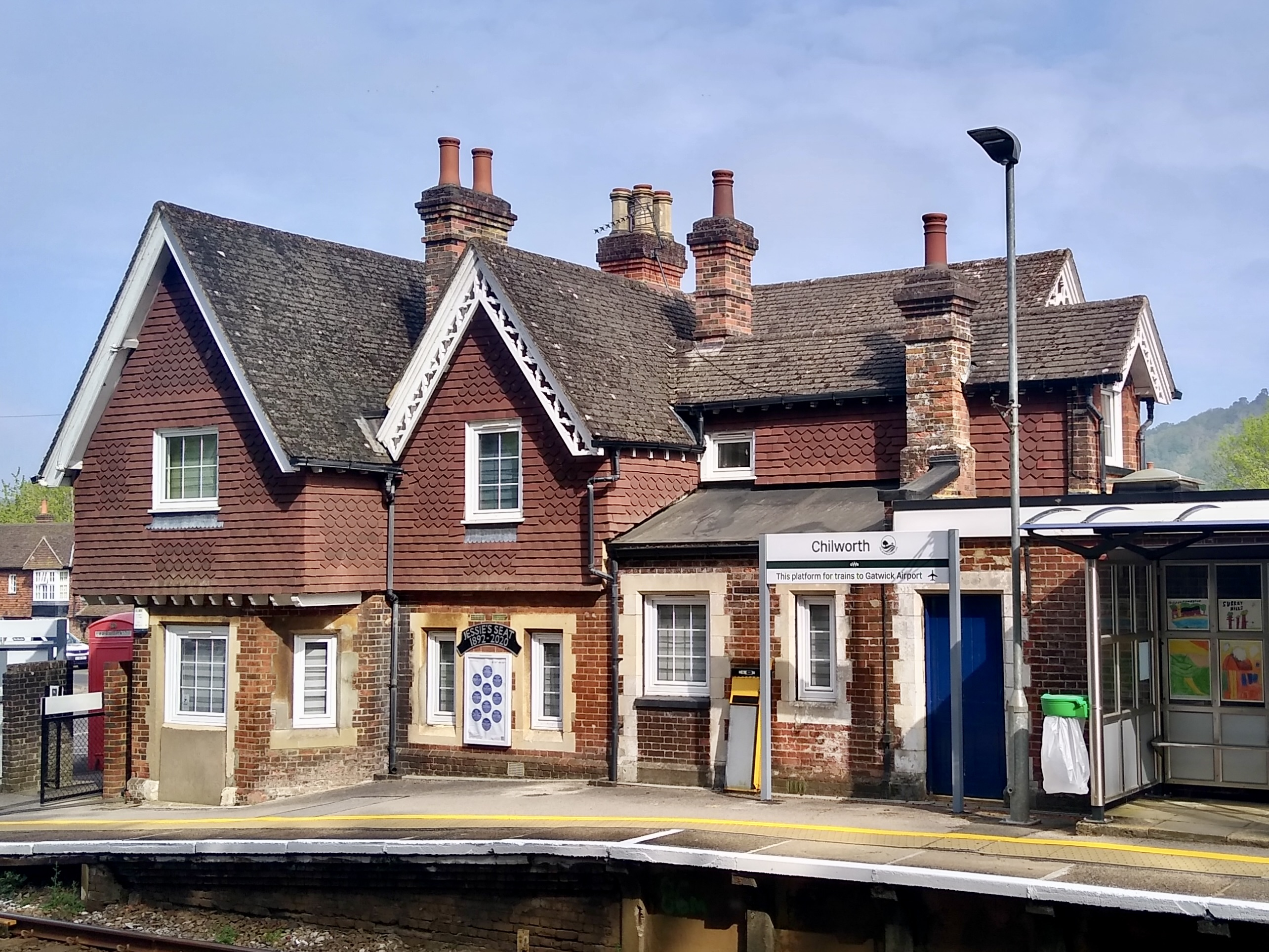

General information
- Location: Chilworth, Surrey, Guildford; England
- Grid reference: TQ031472
- Manager: Great Western Railway
- Platforms: 2

Other information
- Station code: CHL
- Classification: DfT category F2

History
- Opened: 20 August 1849
- Original company: Reading, Guildford and Reigate Railway
- Pre-grouping: South Eastern Railway
- Post-grouping: Southern Railway

Passengers
- 2021/22: ▲17,202
- 2022/23: ▲23,712
- 2023/24: ▲25,844
- 2024/25: ▲27,352
- 2025/26: ▲28,052
Location
Notes
- Passenger statistics from the Office of Rail and Road

Chilworth railway station serves the village of Chilworth, Surrey, England. The station, and all trains serving it, are operated by the Great Western Railway. It is on the North Downs Line, 39 miles 15 chains (39.19 miles, 63.07 km) measured from London Charing Cross via Redhill.

== History ==
The Reading, Guildford and Reigate Railway opened the station in 1849 as "Chilworth and Albury", although the village of Albury is over 1.2 miles (2 km) away.

In 1888, the Chilworth Gunpowder Company reached agreement with the South Eastern Railway to extend its internal tramway to a siding at the station to enable the transhipment of coal by rail to supply the steam mills.

British Railways destaffed the station in November 1967. In 1978, the signal box was closed, and the signalling controls were transferred to the two nearest staffed boxes at Shalford and Gomshall. The original Victorian footbridge and road crossing gates from the station were removed and sold for £1 to the artist David Shepherd. They were transported on BRS low loader trucks to Somerset, for re-use on the East Somerset Railway, Cranmore. The station has two platforms, which can each accommodate a six-coach train.

== Services ==
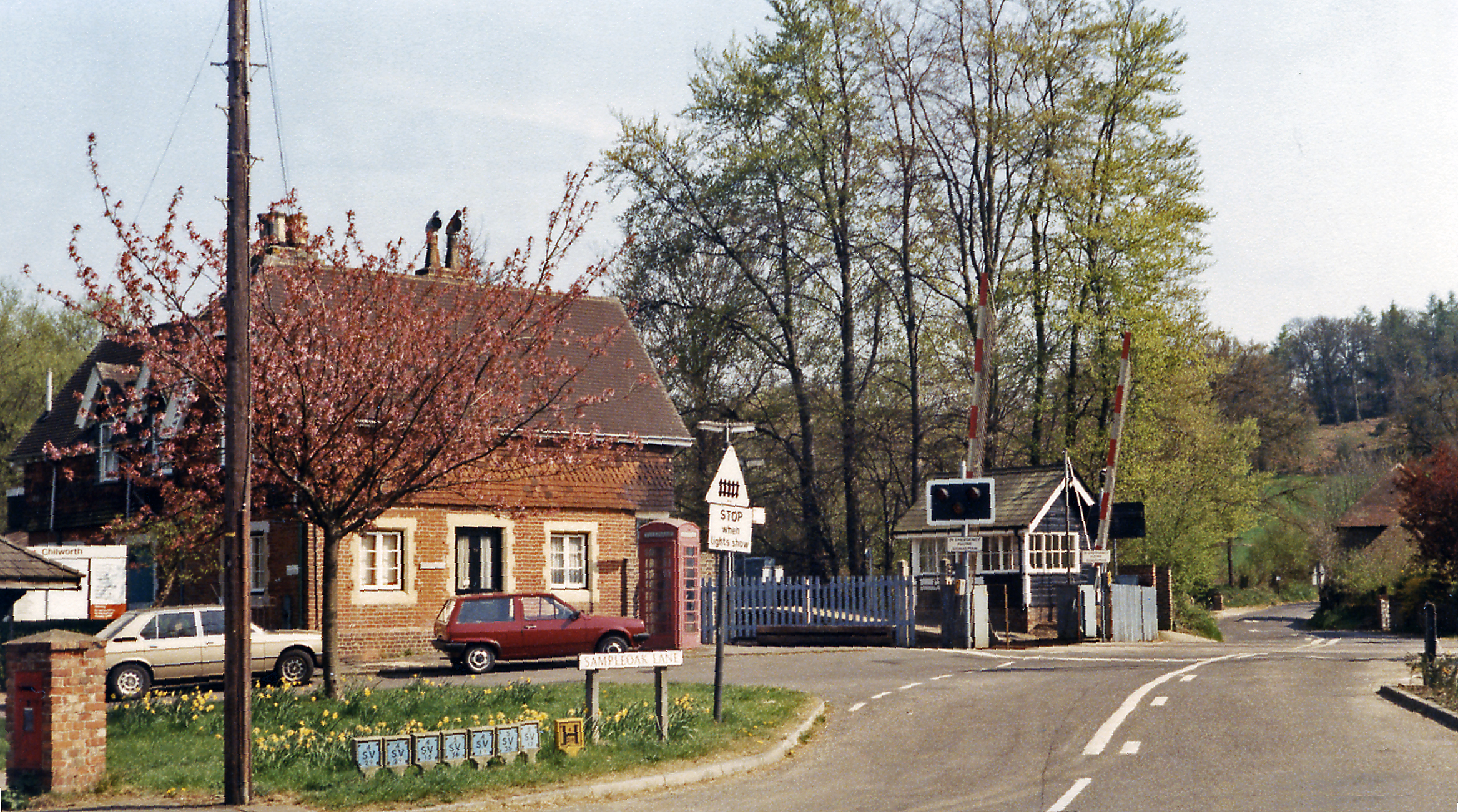
View from the roadway in 1984

The typical off-peak service is one train every two hours in each direction between Reading via Guildford and Gatwick Airport. During the peak hours, the service is increased to one train per hour in each direction.

Preceding station	National Rail	Following station
Gomshall	Great Western Railway North Downs Line	Shalford

== Sources ==
- Mitchell, Vic; Smith, Keith (1989). Guildford to Redhill. Country rail routes. Midhurst: Middleton Press. ISBN 0-9065-2063-0.
