= Gomshall railway station =

Railway station in Surrey, England

Gomshall
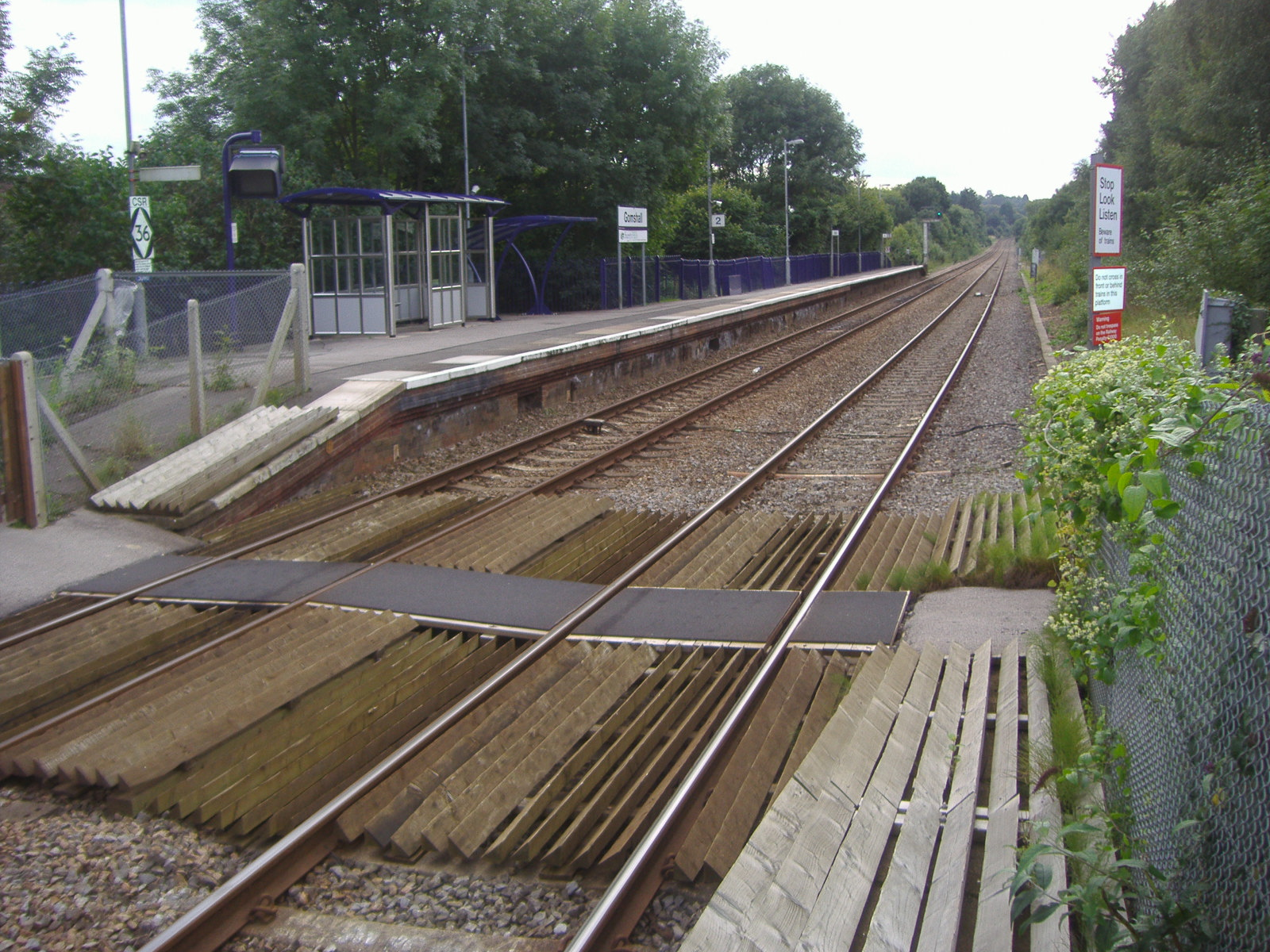

General information
- Location: Gomshall, Guildford; England
- Coordinates: 51°13′08″N 0°26′31″W
- Grid reference: TQ089478
- Manager: Great Western Railway
- Platforms: 2

Other information
- Station code: GOM
- Classification: DfT category F2

History
- Opened: 20 August 1849
- Original company: Reading, Guildford and Reigate Railway
- Pre-grouping: South Eastern Railway
- Post-grouping: Southern Railway

Key dates
- 20 August 1849: Opened as Gomshall and Shere Heath
- March 1850: Renamed Gomshall and Sheire
- September 1852: Renamed Gomshall and Shere
- 12 May 1980: Renamed Gomshall

Passengers
- 2020/21: ▼17,294
- 2021/22: ▲44,574
- 2022/23: ▲47,628
- 2023/24: ▲50,042
- 2024/25: ▲58,620
Location
Notes
- Passenger statistics from the Office of Rail and Road

Gomshall railway station serves the village of Gomshall in Surrey, England. The station, and all trains serving it, are operated by Great Western Railway. It is on the North Downs Line, 35 miles 21 chains (35.26 miles, 56.75 km) measured from London Charing Cross via Redhill.

== History ==
The station was opened by the Reading, Guildford and Reigate Railway on 20 August 1849, and was originally named Gomshall and Shere Heath; it was renamed Gomshall and Sheire in March 1850, and Gomshall and Shere in September 1852. On 12 May 1980, the name was simplified to Gomshall. As the older names suggest, it also serves the nearby village of Shere. It has been unstaffed since 1967. The station is 35 miles 21 chains (56.7 km) from Charing Cross.

== Accidents and incidents ==
On 20 February 1904, a troop train, en route to Southampton, hauled by SECR C class 0-6-0 No. 294 was derailed at Gomshall station. There were no fatalities but the locomotive crew and four soldiers of the Northumberland Fusiliers were injured.

== Platforms ==
Gomshall Station has two staggered platforms. A gated foot crossing had been in use to access both until 25 November 2016 when it was replaced by a permanent bridge with ramped and stepped access.

== Services ==
All services at Gomshall are operated by Great Western Railway using Class 165 and 166 DMUs.

The typical off-peak service is one train every two hours in each direction between Reading via Guildford and Gatwick Airport. During the peak hours, the service is increased to one train per hour in each direction.

On Sundays, eastbound services at the station run only as far as Redhill.

Preceding station	National Rail	Following station
Dorking West	Great Western Railway North Downs Line	Chilworth
