= Blackwater railway station =

Railway station in Hampshire, England

Coordinates: 51.332°N 0.777°W

Blackwater
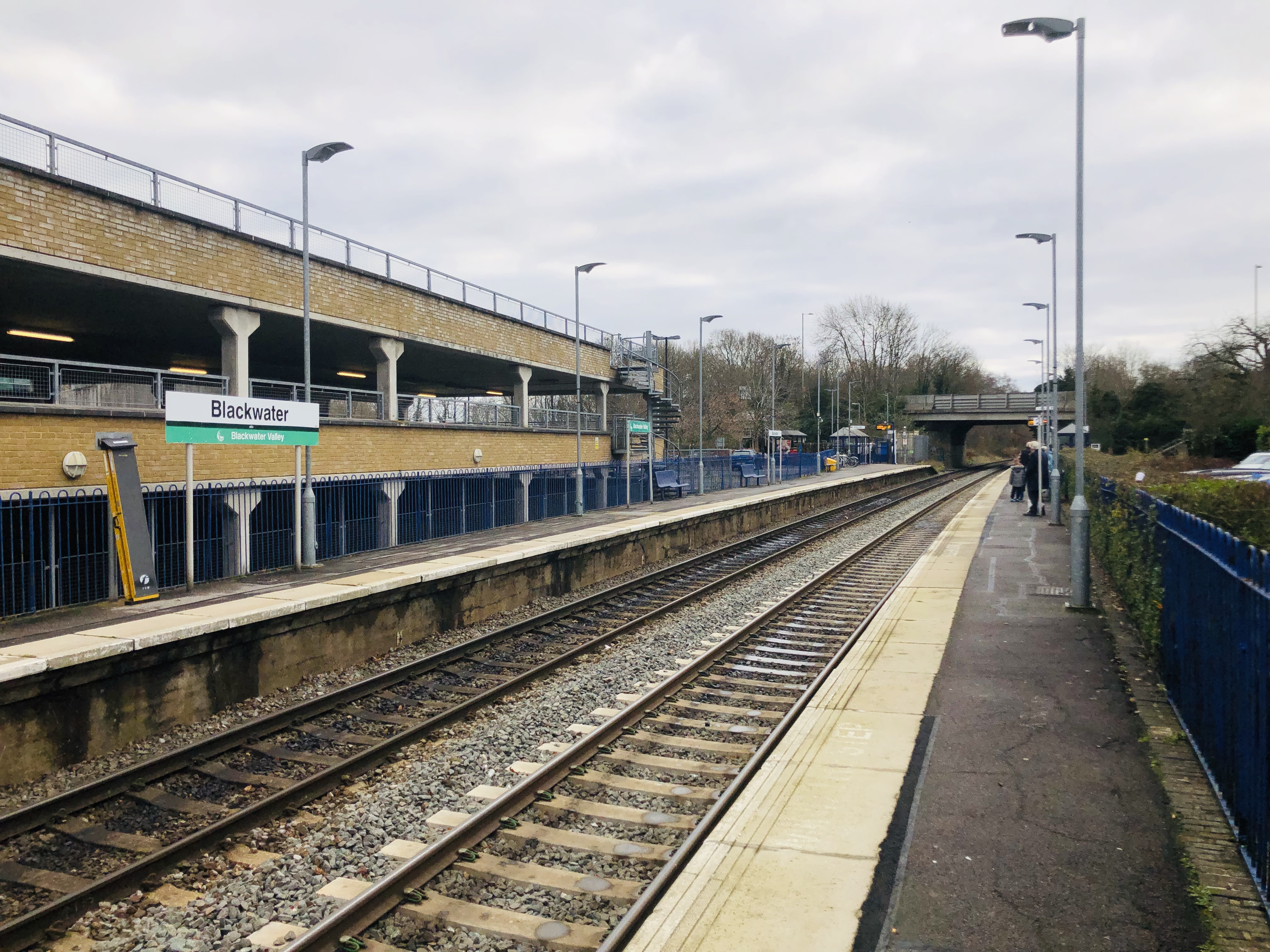
- The platforms at Blackwater station, looking southeast

General information
- Location: Blackwater, Hart; England
- Grid reference: SU853598
- Manager: Great Western Railway
- Platforms: 2

Other information
- Station code: BAW
- Classification: DfT category F2

Key dates
- 4 July 1849: Opened

Passengers
- 2020/21: ▼99,814
- 2021/22: ▲0.264 million
- 2022/23: ▲0.321 million
- 2023/24: ▲0.344 million
- 2024/25: ▲0.384 million
Location
Notes
- Passenger statistics from the Office of Rail and Road

Blackwater railway station is a railway station in Blackwater, a town on the borders of Hampshire, Surrey and Berkshire in England. The station is managed by Great Western Railway, who provide services on the North Downs Line from Reading to Redhill and Gatwick Airport.

== History ==
The station opened on 4 July 1849 by the South Eastern Railway. In August 1851, it was renamed Blackwater & Sandhurst, but reverted to Blackwater in 1852 after Sandhurst Halt opened. In May 1897, the station was renamed again to Blackwater & York Town, then Blackwater & Camberley in June 1913. On 9 July 1923, it was renamed for the last time, becoming just Blackwater.

In 1961, the station had a building on platform 1, sidings and a signal box. At some point after this, they were all demolished or removed.

In 2016, Surrey County Council and GWR joined forces to seek central government funds to electrify the line. They claimed the scheme would create 8,000 jobs and a £1.8bn economic boost to the area. Ultimately the bid was unsuccessful and the line remains unelectrified.

In December 2023, around half the services from the station were extended from Redhill to Gatwick Airport, resulting in two trains per hour to the airport up from the previous one per hour. This led to nearly 100,000 new passenger journeys year on year.

In April 2025, GWR bosses met with Business Surrey, who reported a key change could be an introduction of fast charge battery trains, something that GWR have been exploring on their Greenford Line.

== Facilities ==
Blackwater station has two platforms: platform 1 for services towards Gatwick Airport and platform 2 for services towards Reading. The station is unstaffed. There are ticket machines on both platforms and an information point on platform 1. Both platforms have small sheltered seating areas. Bike parking is available on platform 1

== Services ==
All services at Blackwater are operated by Great Western Railway using Class 165 and 166 DMUs.

The typical off-peak service is two trains per hour in each direction between Reading and Gatwick Airport via Guildford. During the late evenings, the service is reduced to hourly in each direction.

Preceding station	National Rail	Following station
Farnborough North	Great Western Railway North Downs Line	Sandhurst

== Connections ==
Stagecoach South route 3 serves the station providing connections to Yateley, Camberley and Aldershot.
