= Sandhurst railway station =

Railway station in Berkshire, England

Coordinates: 51.346°N 0.804°W

Sandhurst
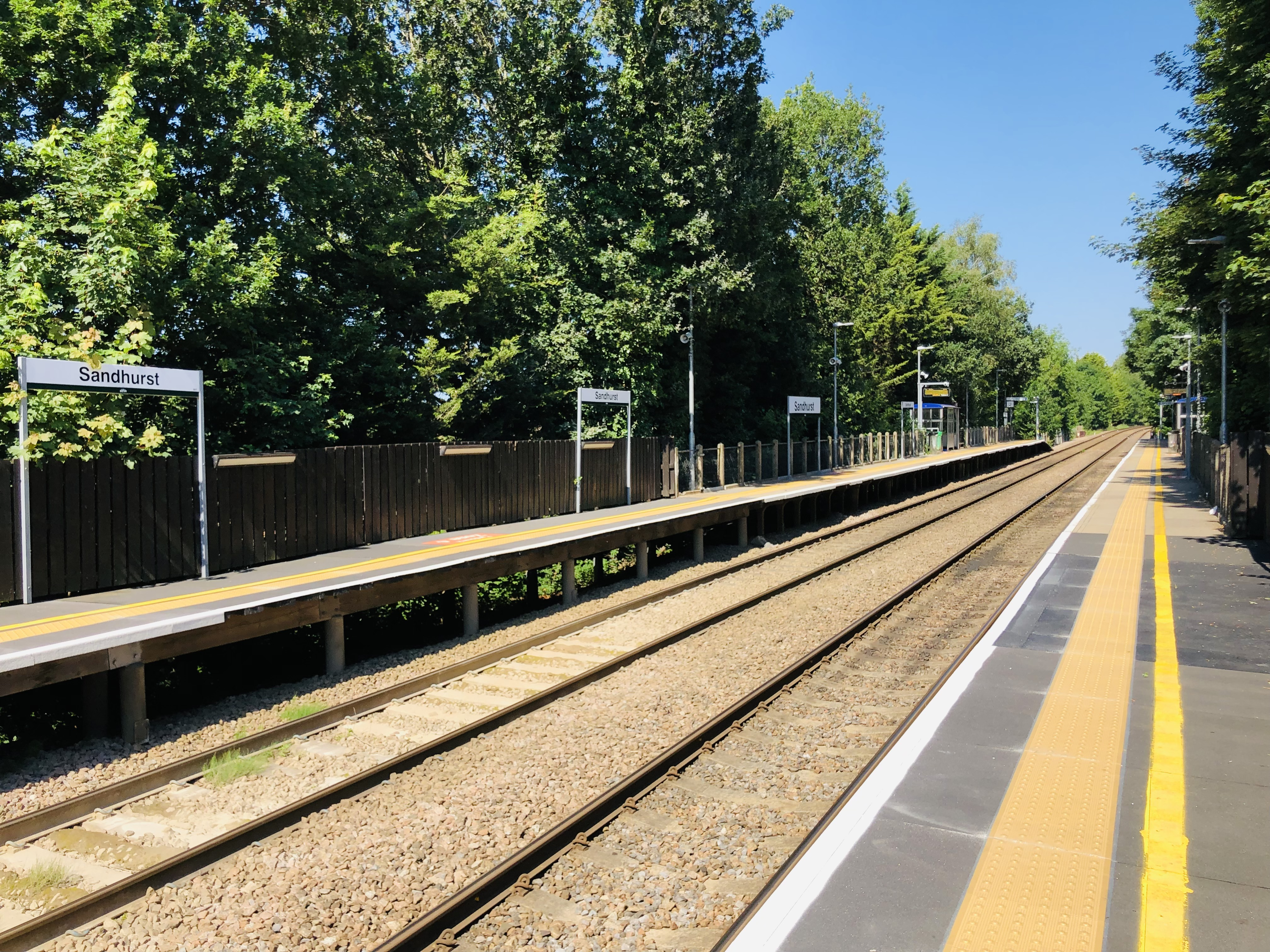
- The platforms at Sandhurst, looking north-west

General information
- Location: Sandhurst, Bracknell Forest; England
- Grid reference: SU833615
- Manager: Great Western Railway
- Platforms: 2

Other information
- Station code: SND
- Classification: DfT category F1

Key dates
- 1909: Opened

Passengers
- 2020/21: ▼38,252
- 2021/22: ▲0.104 million
- 2022/23: ▲0.125 million
- 2023/24: ▲0.136 million
- 2024/25: ▲0.142 million
Location
Notes
- Passenger statistics from the Office of Rail and Road

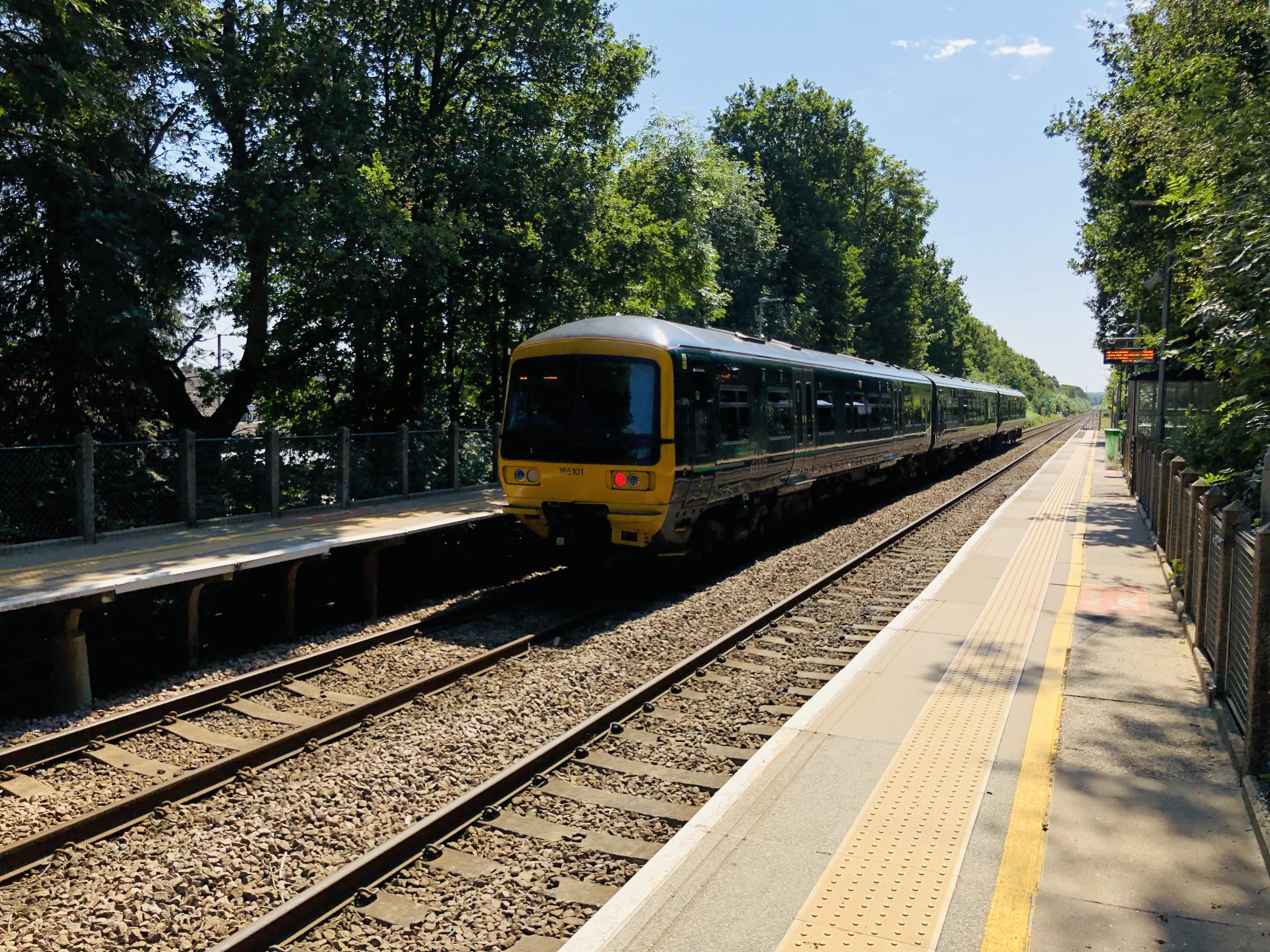
165101 at Sandhurst, with a Great Western Railway service from Reading to Redhill

Sandhurst railway station, known by National Rail as Sandhurst (Berks), serves the town of Sandhurst in Berkshire, England. The station is managed by Great Western Railway, who operate services on the North Downs Line from Reading to Guildford, Redhill and Gatwick Airport. The station is located 11.5 miles (18.5 km) south-east of Reading.

Sandhurst station has two platforms: platform 1 for services towards Gatwick Airport and platform 2 for services towards Reading. The station is unstaffed; an enquiries and emergencies telephone is situated at the bottom of platform 1. The station uses LED-based live departure boards and audio announcements to report arrivals and delays to commuters. The station has neither a ticket office nor a ticket machine; tickets therefore have to be purchased on a train or online.

== History ==
A temporary station existed between 1852 and 1853 on the north side of the bridge on Church Road, Little Sandhurst. It had been built for "the exercise of the Line and the Militia during the ensuing open season. Ground is everywhere being laid out for camps of instruction. The camp and station closed with the outbreak of the Crimean War. It reopened for a single day on 2 June 1856 "for those wishing to attend the laying of the foundation stone of the main building at the Royal Military College at Sandhurst by Queen Victoria." It was not until 1909 that the station opened permanently as 'Sandhurst Halt'. In around 1918, there were proposals to site a replacement station and goods yard a 1/4 of a mile northwards along the route, but seemingly, these never came to fruition.

== Services ==
All services at Sandhurst are operated by Great Western Railway using Class 165 and 166 DMUs.

The typical off-peak service is one train per hour in each direction between Reading and Gatwick Airport via Guildford. During the peak hours, the service is increased to two trains per hour in each direction.

On Sundays, eastbound services at the station run only as far as Redhill.

Preceding station	National Rail	Following station
Blackwater	Great Western Railway North Downs Line	Crowthorne

== See also ==
- Bendigo (formerly Sandhurst) railway station, Australia
- Sandhurst Road railway station, India
