= North Downs Line =

Railway line in South East England

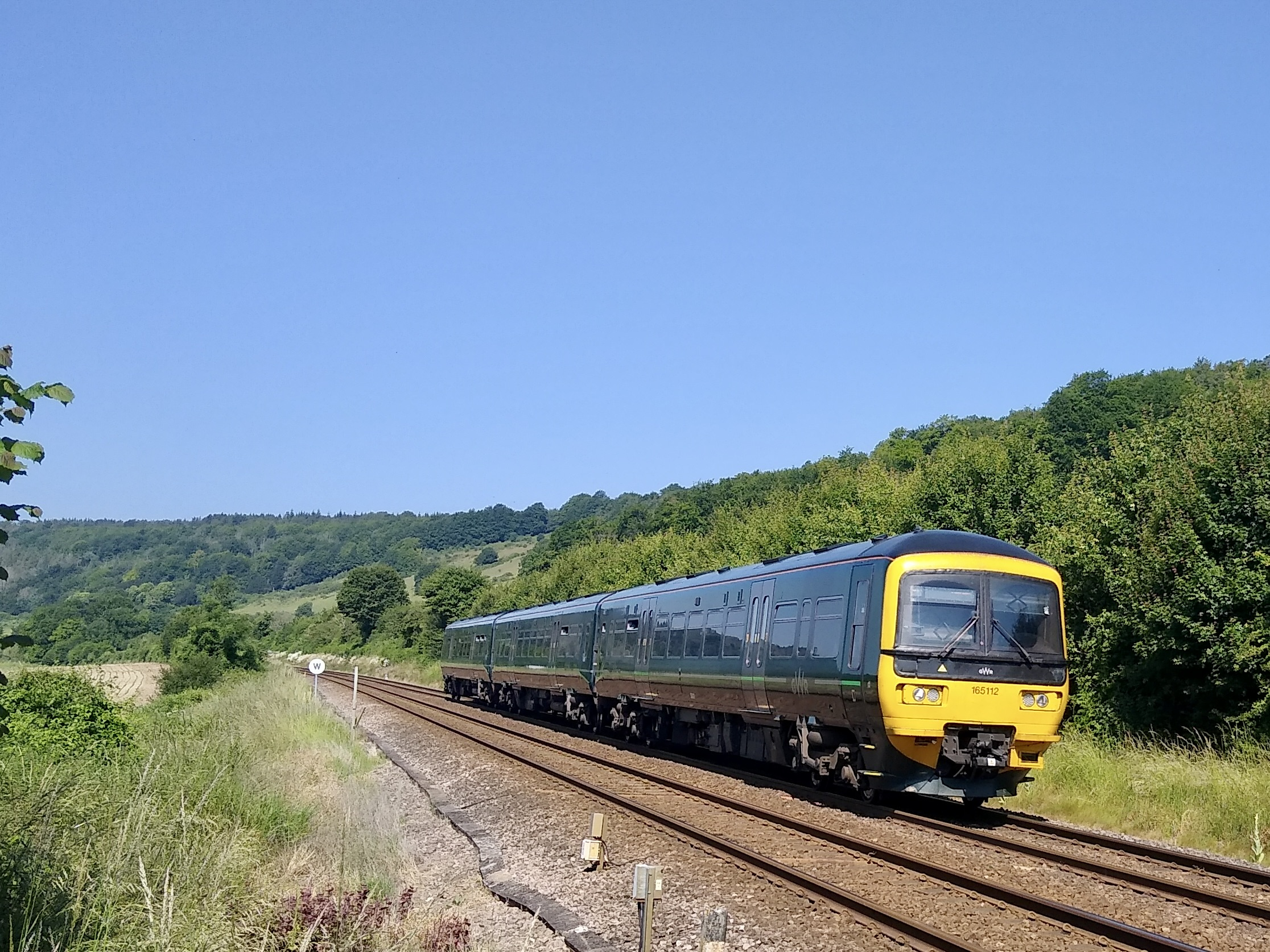
- A Class 165 unit approaching Dorking West with the hills of the North Downs behind

Overview
- Status: Operational
- Owner: Network Rail
- Locale: Berkshire, Hampshire, Surrey
- Termini: Reading; Redhill

Service
- Type: Heavy rail
- System: National Rail
- Operator(s): Great Western Railway; South Western Railway; Southern
- Rolling stock: Class 165, Class 166, Class 450, Class 458, Class 377

History
- Opened: 1849

Technical
- Line length: 45 mi 40 ch (73.2 km)
- Track gauge: 1,435 mm (4 ft 8 1/2 in) standard gauge
- Electrification: Third rail, 750 V DC (Reading–Wokingham; Aldershot South Junction–Guildford; Reigate–Redhill)
- Operating speed: 70 mph (110 km/h) (maximum)
Route map
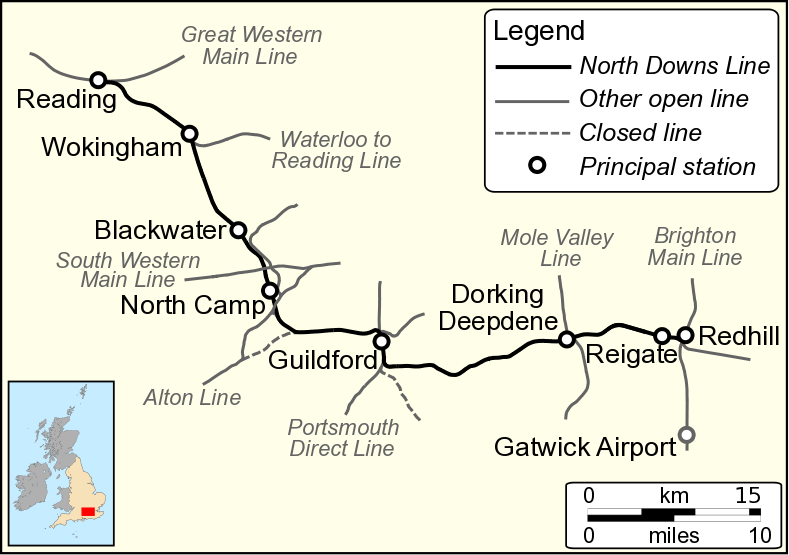

The North Downs Line is a railway line in South East England. It runs for 45 miles 40 chains (73.2 km) from Reading in Berkshire to Redhill in Surrey. It is named after the North Downs, a range of chalk hills that runs parallel to the eastern part of the route. The name was introduced in 1989 by Network SouthEast, the then operator. The North Downs Line serves the settlements in the Blackwater Valley as well as the towns of Guildford, Dorking and Reigate. It acts as an orbital route around the south-west of London and has direct connections to the Great Western Main Line at Reading, the Waterloo–Reading line at Wokingham, the Alton line at Ash, the Portsmouth Direct line at Guildford and the Brighton Main Line at Redhill.

Three different operators run passenger services on the North Downs Line. Great Western Railway runs services along the entire length of the line from Reading to Redhill, the majority of which continue along the Brighton Main Line to Gatwick Airport. Southern trains between Reigate and London Victoria use a 1 mi 67 ch (3.0 km) section west of Redhill. South Western Railway services between the capital and Reading use the line west of Wokingham and the same company operates between Guildford and Ash en route to Aldershot.

The majority of the North Downs Line was constructed by the independent Reading, Guildford and Reigate Railway company (RG&RR), although the section between Guildford and Ash Junction was built by the London and South Western Railway. The line opened in 1849 and services were run from the outset by the South Eastern Railway, which took over the RG&RR in 1852. Three sections of the line were electrified by the Southern Railway in the 1930s although around 29 route miles (47 km) remain unelectrified. In the early 21st century, infrastructure works to increase the capacity of the line were undertaken, including the provision of new platforms at Reading and Redhill.

== Route ==
=== Overview ===
The North Downs Line is a 45-mile-40-chain (73.2 km) railway line in South East England. It links Reading railway station on the Great Western Main Line in Berkshire to Redhill on the Brighton Main Line in Surrey. It serves the settlements in the Blackwater Valley on the borders of Hampshire, Surrey and Berkshire, as well as the Surrey towns of Guildford, Dorking and Reigate. It acts as an orbital route bypassing the south-west of London and has direct connections to the Waterloo–Reading line at Wokingham, the Alton line at Ash and the Portsmouth Direct line at Guildford. The 2015 "Surrey Rail Strategy" noted that 56% of passengers on the route connect to services on other railway lines and that a quarter of journeys either start or end at Reading. Around 13% of passengers travel to or from Gatwick Airport.

The name "North Downs Line" was first used in 1989 by Network SouthEast, the then operator of the line. Between Redhill and Ash, the line runs roughly parallel with the North Downs, a range of chalk hills that runs from Farnham to the White Cliffs of Dover. Between Ash and Reading, the line crosses the sands, gravels and clays of the London Basin. The steepest gradients, 1 in 96, and the summit of the line are near Gomshall, where the route crosses the watershed between the Rivers Mole and Wey in Surrey. The distances along the line between Redhill (22 miles 40 chains) and Shalford Junction (41 mi 60 ch), and between Ash Junction (48 mi 34 ch) and Reading (68 mi 68 ch) are measured from Charing Cross station in London.

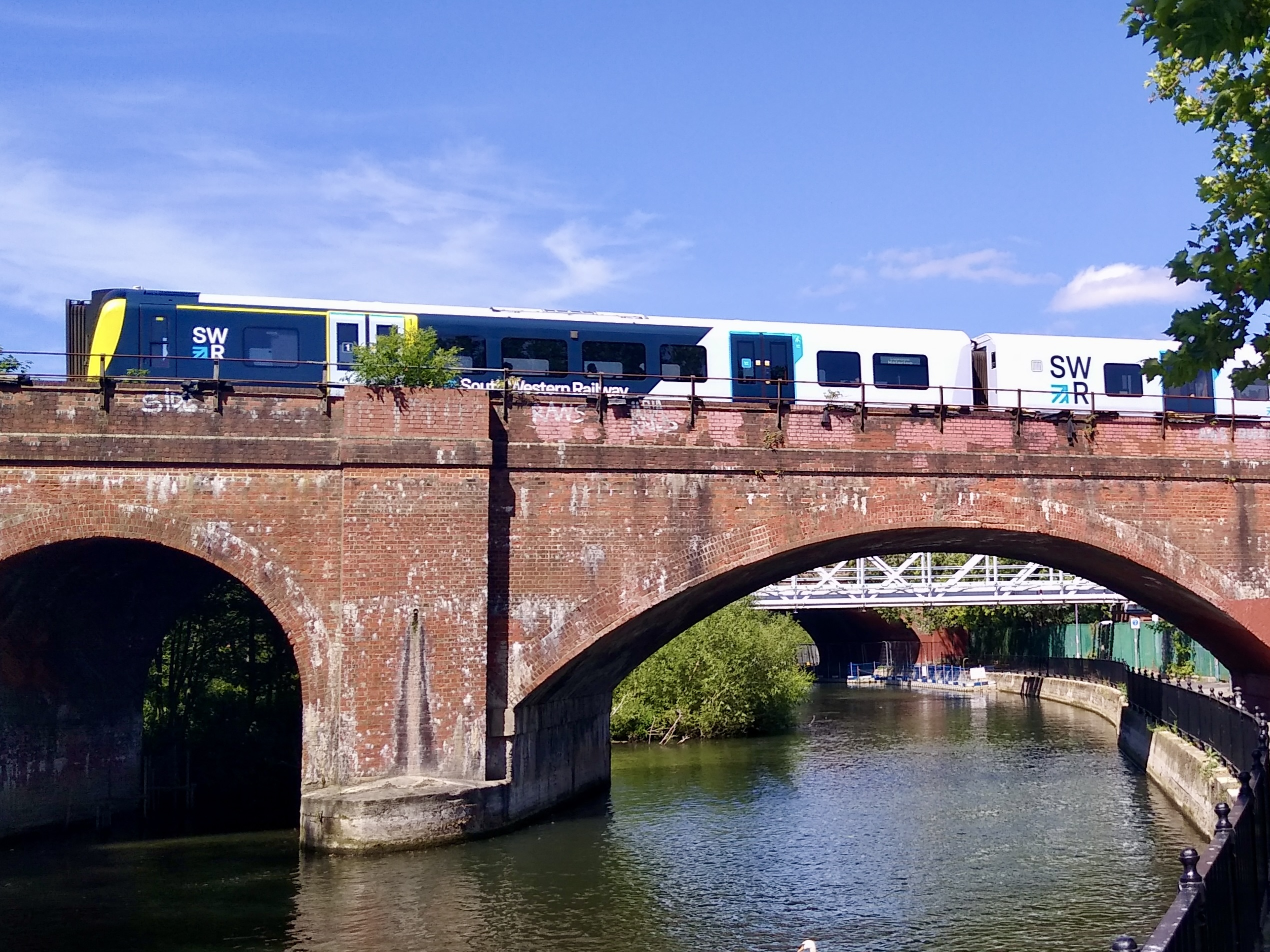
A Class 450 unit crosses the navigable River Kennet to the east of Reading station.

The North Downs Line is double track for the entirety of its 45 mi 40 ch (73.2 km) length and has a maximum operational line speed of 70 mph (110 km/h) for passenger trains. Three sections of the line, Redhill–Reigate, Guildford–Aldershot South Junction and Wokingham–Reading, are electrified using the 750 V DC third-rail system. Two sections, Reigate–Shalford Junction and Aldershot South Junction–Wokingham, together totalling 29 route miles (47 km), are unelectrified. The line has a W6 loading gauge, and overnight engineering possessions of up to 4 1/2 hours are available. In 2006, Network Rail classified the North Downs Line as "congested", but, following the construction of new infrastructure, this status was revoked in 2023.

=== Reading to Guildford ===
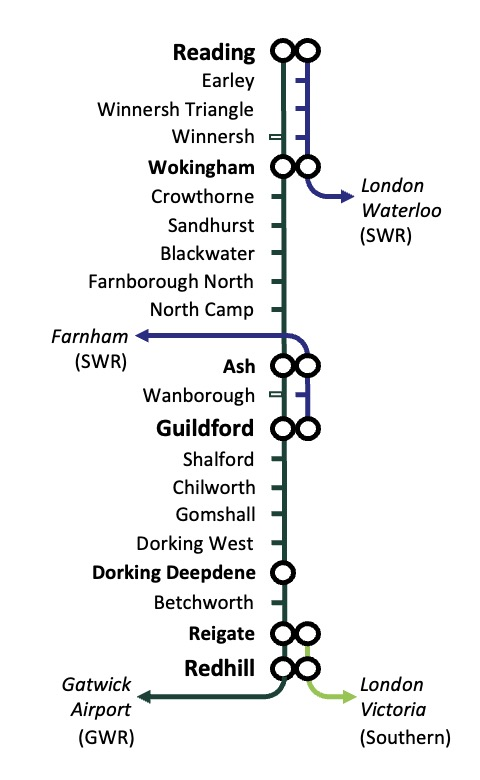
Passenger services on the North Downs Line: The stopping pattern of GWR services varies according to the time of day, and no train calls at all stations.

The Reading to Guildford section of the North Downs Line is 25 mi 41 ch (41.1 km) in length and has 13 stations in total. Reading and Guildford stations are managed by Network Rail and have 15 and 7 operational platforms respectively. The other 11 stations have two platforms each. Earley, Winnersh Triangle, Winnersh, Wokingham, Ash and Wanborough stations are managed by South Western Railway (SWR). Crowthorne, Sandhurst, Blackwater, Farnborough North and North Camp stations are managed by Great Western Railway (GWR). The passenger train services that use this section of the North Downs Line are:

- Reading to Redhill and Gatwick Airport, operated by GWR using Class 165 and Class 166 units
- Reading to London Waterloo, operated by SWR using Class 458 and Class 455 units
- Farnham and Aldershot to Guildford, operated by SWR using Class 450 units

West of Wokingham Junction and east of Aldershot South Junction, this part of the line is electrified using the 750 V DC third-rail system, leaving an 11 mi 71 ch (19.1 km) unelectrified central section. Most services on the North Downs Line use platforms 4, 5 and 6 at Reading station, but access to other platforms is possible. The Reading station area is controlled from Thames Valley rail operating centre, the line from Earley to North Camp is controlled by Basingstoke rail operating centre, and the section from North Camp is controlled by Guildford signal box. The majority of this section has a line speed of 70 mph (110 km/h) with the exception of the approaches to Reading, Wokingham and Guildford stations, and a 40 mph (64 km/h) restriction at Ash Junction where the line curves sharply. The steepest gradient, to the west of Guildford, is 1 in 100.

The Waterloo–Reading line diverges from this part of the North Downs Line at Wokingham Junction, and a spur to the Alton line joins at Aldershot South Junction. In addition, the line passes beneath the South Western Main Line at Farnborough, but there is no longer a junction between the two. This section passes over two navigable waterways, the River Kennet and the Basingstoke Canal, as well as the unnavigable River Loddon and its tributary, the Blackwater.

Stations between Reading and Guildford (ordered from west to east)
Station	Mileage	Number of platforms	Managing company	Trains operated by	Opening date	Original name	Ref.
Reading	68 mi 68 ch (110.8 km) from Charing Cross via Redhill	15	Network Rail	GWR; SWR; CrossCountry; Elizabeth line	30 March 1840		
Earley	66 mi 1 ch (106.2 km) from Charing Cross via Redhill	2	SWR	SWR	1 November 1863		
Winnersh Triangle	64 mi 72 ch (104.4 km) from Charing Cross via Redhill	2	SWR	SWR	12 May 1986		
Winnersh	64 mi 10 ch (103.2 km) from Charing Cross via Redhill	2	SWR	SWR; GWR (Note: GWR serves Winnersh and Wanborough at peak times only.)	1 January 1910	Sindlesham and Hurst	
Wokingham	62 mi 13 ch (100.0 km) from Charing Cross via Redhill	2	SWR	SWR; GWR	4 July 1849		
Crowthorne	58 mi 66 ch (94.7 km) from Charing Cross via Redhill	2	GWR	GWR	29 January 1859	Wellington College	
Sandhurst	57 mi 22 ch (92.2 km) from Charing Cross via Redhill	2	GWR	GWR	4 May 1852 (Note: Originally opened on 4 May 1842, Sandhurst station closed in December the following year. It reopened permanently in 1909.)		
Blackwater	55 mi 58 ch (89.7 km) from Charing Cross via Redhill	2	GWR	GWR	4 July 1849		
Farnborough North	53 mi 16 ch (85.6 km) from Charing Cross via Redhill	2	GWR	GWR	4 July 1849	Farnborough	
North Camp	51 mi 18 ch (82.4 km) from Charing Cross via Redhill	2	GWR	GWR	August 1857 (Note: The first record of North Camp station is from August 1857, but the exact opening date is unclear.)		
Ash	49 mi 18 ch (79.2 km) from Charing Cross via Redhill	2	SWR	SWR; GWR	20 August 1849		
Wanborough	34 mi 29 ch (55.3 km) from London Waterloo via Woking	2	SWR	SWR; GWR	1 September 1891		
Guildford	30 mi 27 ch (48.8 km) from London Waterloo via Woking	7	Network Rail	SWR; GWR	5 May 1845		

=== Shalford Junction to Redhill ===
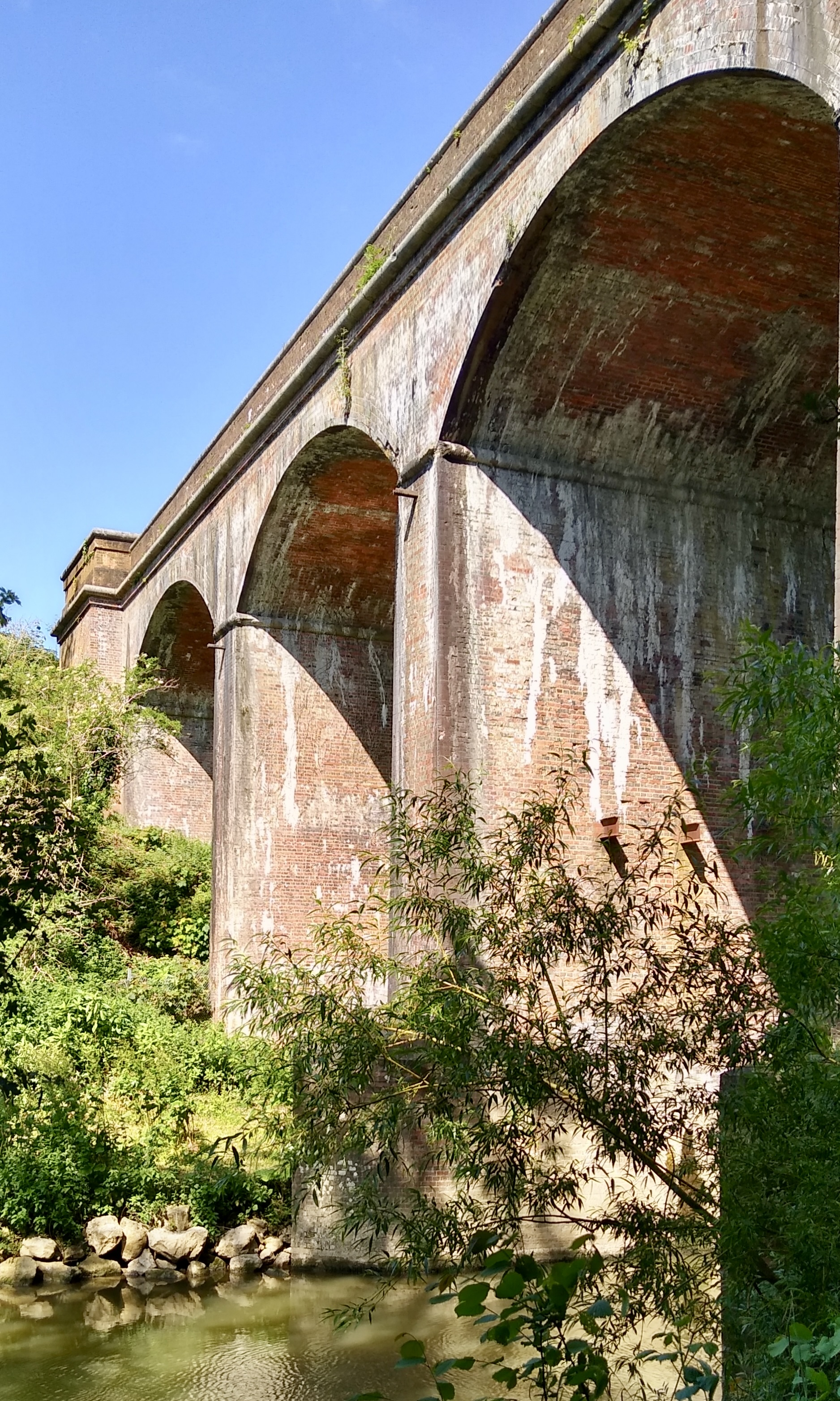
The line crosses the River Mole to the east of Dorking Deepdene on a five-arch, brick viaduct.

Between Guildford and Shalford Junction, GWR trains use the Portsmouth Direct line to travel between the two parts of the North Downs Line. The route passes through two tunnels, Guildford Chalk Tunnel and St Catherine's Tunnel. Reversible working is available on the down line on this section of track.

The Shalford Junction to Redhill section of the North Downs Line is 19 mi 79 ch (32.2 km) long and has eight stations in total. Reigate and Redhill stations are managed by Southern, but the remaining six stations (Shalford, Chilworth, Gomshall, Dorking West, Dorking Deepdene and Betchworth) are managed by GWR. Redhill has four platforms, but the other seven stations have two each. The passenger train services that use this section of the North Downs Line are:

- Reading to Redhill and Gatwick Airport, operated by GWR (Note: Owing to the junction layout between the North Downs and Brighton Main Lines, trains running between Reading and Gatwick Airport must reverse at Redhill.)
- Reigate to London Victoria via Redhill, operated by Southern

Much of this part of the North Downs Line runs immediately to the south of the North Downs escarpment, although the route deviates to the south between Chilworth and Gomshall to avoid Albury Park. Only the 1 mi 67 ch (3.0 km) section between Reigate and Redhill is electrified. Between Shalford Junction and Gomshall, the line is controlled from Guildford signal box and the majority of the route to the east is controlled by Reigate signal box. Redhill railway station and its approaches are controlled by Three Bridges rail operations centre. The maximum speed on this part of the North Downs Line is 70 mph (110 km/h).

The route crosses the Mole Valley Line immediately to the east of Dorking Deepdene, but there is no longer a junction between the two. The navigable River Wey is crossed at Shalford via a steel truss bridge, which replaced the original wooden bridge in 1902. The North Downs Line crosses the River Mole on a five-arch, brick viaduct, built when the line was constructed in the late 1840s. The A24 dual carriageway at Dorking is crossed on a steel bridge, installed in 1964.

Stations between Shalford Junction and Redhill (ordered from west to east)
Station	Mileage from Charing Cross via Redhill	Number of platforms	Managing company	Trains operated by	Opening date	Original name	Ref.
Shalford	41 mi 2 ch (66.0 km)	2	GWR	GWR	20 August 1849		
Chilworth	39 mi 15 ch (63.1 km)	2	GWR	GWR	20 August 1849		
Gomshall	35 mi 21 ch (56.7 km)	2	GWR	GWR	20 August 1849		
Dorking West	30 mi 42 ch (49.1 km)	2	GWR	GWR	4 July 1849	Dorking	
Dorking Deepdene	29 mi 65 ch (48.0 km)	2	GWR	GWR	February 1851 (Note: The first record of Dorking Deepdene station is from February 1851, but the exact opening date is unclear.)	Box Hill and Leatherhead Road	
Betchworth	27 mi 17 ch (43.8 km)	2	GWR	GWR	4 July 1849		
Reigate	24 mi 27 ch (39.2 km)	2	Southern	Southern; GWR	4 July 1849		
Redhill	22 mi 40 ch (36.2 km)	4	Southern	Southern; Thameslink; GWR	26 May 1842 (relocated 15 April 1844)	Reigate	

== History ==
=== Proposal and authorisation ===
The Reading, Guildford and Reigate Railway company (RG&RR) was formed in August 1845. It was led initially by Frederick Mangles, a banker from Guildford, and most of the board members were businessmen from London and Surrey. The company's stated objective was to build a line linking the three towns in its name to "secure through traffic passing between the West, North and Midlands and the Channel Ports avoiding the congestion of London and thus saving time, distance and expense."

The engineer, Francis Giles, was commissioned to survey the line. His route, presented to the board in January 1846, had an estimated cost of £710,000 (equivalent to £71.56 million in 2025) and was to be double track throughout. It would run from the Great Western Main Line at Reading to the Brighton Main Line at Reigate Junction (later Redhill). Between Dorking and Gomshall, Giles's route required the use of the proposed London & Portsmouth Direct Atmospheric Railway. The approaches to Guildford would use part of the London and South Western Railway (LSWR) lines to Godalming and Alton. (Note: In exchange for running powers over the lines built and owned by the LSWR, the RG&RR was required to pay 35% of the ticket receipts for passengers travelling over the relevant sections.)

Negotiations with other railway companies began at the start of 1846. By mid-January, the RG&RR had bought out the rival Reading and Reigate Company, promoted by David Mocatta, which had proposed a line with similar aims. That March, it agreed terms to run over the LSWR tracks from Shalford Junction to Guildford. In the same month, the South Eastern Railway (SER), which had wanted to build its own short branch from Reigate Junction to Dorking, offered to operate the line. A bill was prepared for Parliament and the RG&RR was authorised on 16 July 1846, the same day that the LSWR's line from Guildford to Alton was approved. The act gave the RG&RR the powers to construct the section of the line from Dorking to Gomshall, if it was not built in time by the London & Portsmouth Direct Atmospheric Railway Company.

=== Route alterations and construction ===
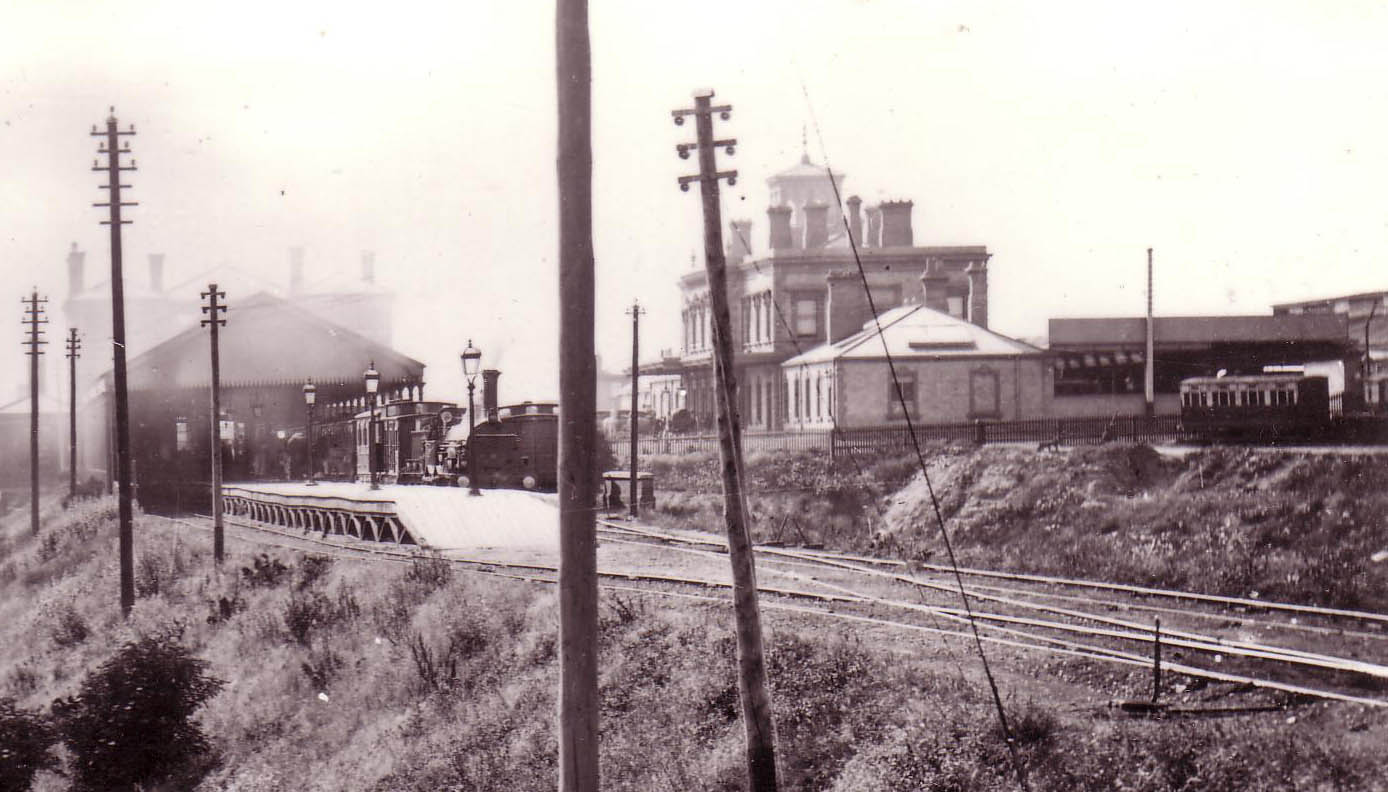
A view of stations at Reading, c. 1865 – c. 1870, with the SER station (later known as Reading Southern) on the left, and the GWR station at higher level on the right

Francis Giles died in March 1847 and his position as surveyor and engineer was taken, on a temporary basis, by Robert Stephenson. Stephenson began to make changes to Giles's scheme, primarily to reduce costs. Around £3000 was to be saved by simplifying the link to the South Western Main Line at Farnborough, eliminating the north–west curve, leaving only the north–east curve to be built. At Reading, Giles had proposed running alongside the Great Western Main Line on a widened embankment, but Stephenson argued that the RG&RR should build a separate station (later known as Reading Southern) instead of sharing the Great Western Railway (GWR) facilities. Minor alterations were also made to the route in the Gomshall, Albury and Ash areas. A deviations bill was submitted to Parliament and was given royal assent on 22 July 1847.

A formal ceremony to mark the start of construction took place near Betchworth on 20 August 1847. (Note: The "first sod" was cut by David Salomons, who had succeeded Frederick Mangles as chairman of the RG&RR in September 1845.) Contracts were awarded to George Wythes and William Jackson for the construction of the Reigate Junction-Dorking and Farnborough-Reading sections. In mid-1848, the plans for the London & Portsmouth Direct Atmospheric Railway were abandoned and the contract to build the Dorking-Shalford Junction section of the RG&RR was awarded to Charles Henfrey that May. The SER was responsible for constructing the stations on the eastern half of the line, for which it was paid £25,000.

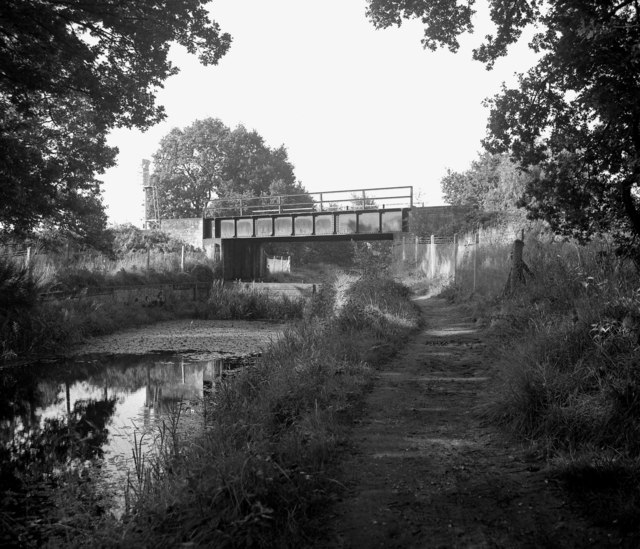
Ash Railway Bridge carries the North Downs Line over the Basingstoke Canal.

Peter Barlow was appointed engineer in late 1847, although the exact date is uncertain. He disagreed strongly with Stephenson's alterations to the station arrangement at Reading but was unable to persuade the RG&RR board to reinstate Giles's original scheme. Barlow made some minor alterations to reduce costs, including reducing the span of the bridge over the Basingstoke Canal from 40 ft (12 m) to 24 ft (7.3 m). He also suggested building the Dorking to Farnborough section as single track, but the board decided to continue with Giles's plans for a fully double-tracked railway. Following the conclusion of negotiations with the LSWR, a bill authorising the curve linking the RG&RR to the South West Main Line at Farnborough was granted royal assent on 26 June 1849.

=== Opening ===
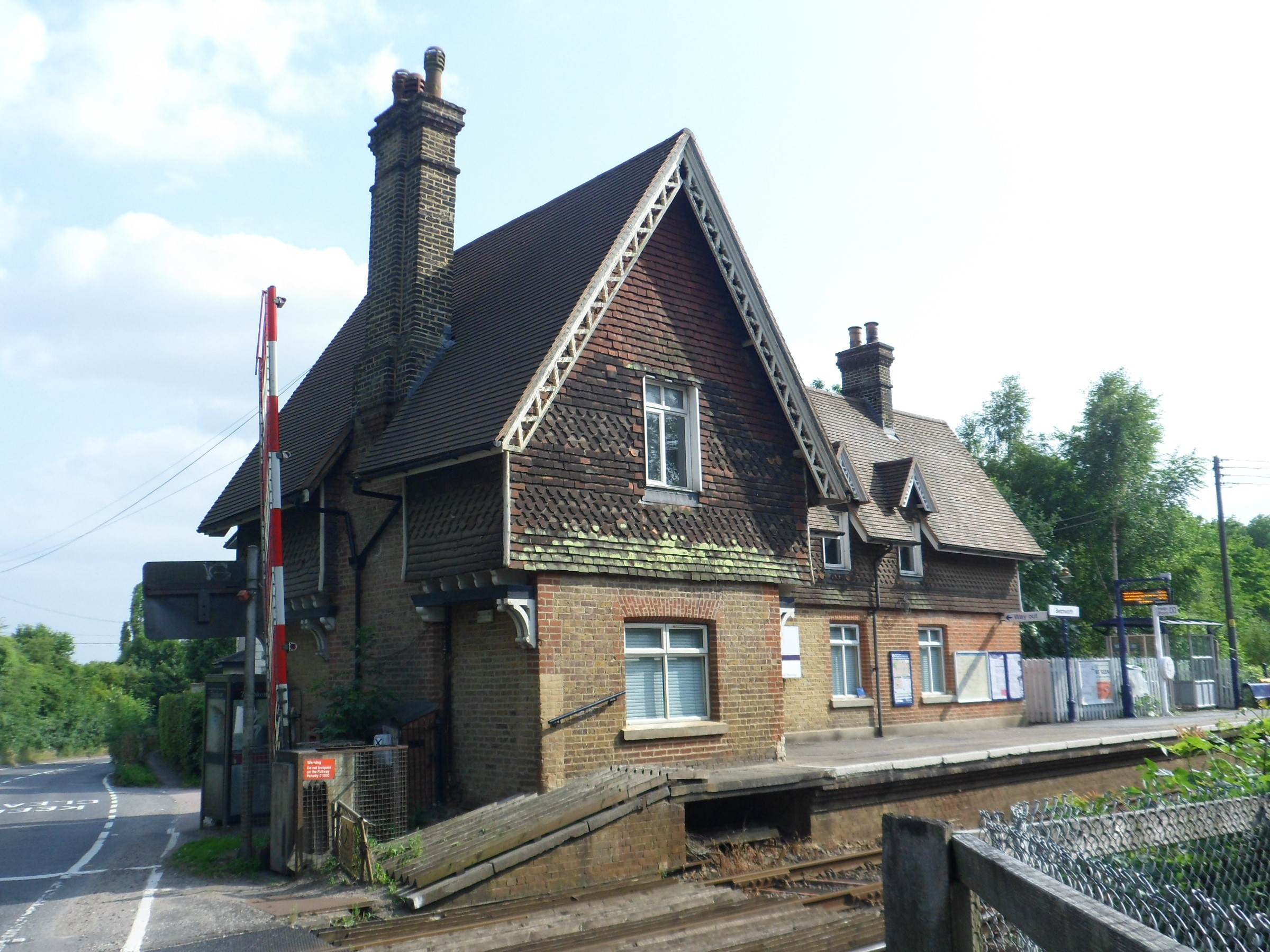
Betchworth station opened on 4 July 1849.

Two sections of the line, from Farnborough to Reading and from Reigate Junction to Dorking, opened on 4 July 1849. (Note: Although the Reigate Junction-Dorking section was completed first, the terms of the authorising act prevented it from opening before the western part of the line. This requirement was made to allay fears that the RG&RR only intended to build the easternmost section and would not extend the line west of Dorking.) Locomotives and rolling stock were delivered to the western section via the single-track link to the South West Main Line. From the outset, the line was worked by the SER. The initial timetable was four trains in each direction per day between Farnborough and Reading. There were seven trains from Dorking to London on weekdays and one fewer in the opposite direction. (Note: The opening of the line had an immediate effect on travel between Dorking and the capital; an article in The Times on 10 October 1849 reported that 14 horses that had formerly hauled a stagecoach from the town to London were to be sold at auction. The owner blamed the sale on the opening of the new railway.)

The sections from Dorking to Shalford and from Guildford to Farnborough opened in August 1849. The collapse of St Catherine's Tunnel delayed the completion of the LSWR-constructed Shalford Junction to Guildford section, which finally opened on 15 October 1849. (Note: Having opened on 15 October 1849, the line between Shalford Junction and Guildford station was closed again between 22 and 24 October 1849 to allow further work to take place on St Catherine's Tunnel.) The initial daily full-line timetable included six trains from London to Reading, with five in the opposite direction, supplemented with an early morning departure from Guildford to the capital and an equivalent mid-evening return.

During the construction of the line, the RG&RR was unsure how best to serve the villages of Shere and Gomshall. When passenger services on the section between Dorking and Shalford began in August 1849, two temporary stations opened – one for each village. The Shere Heath station was closed the following year, and a permanent station was built at Gomshall to replace the temporary platforms there. In 1851, a platform was opened at the point where the line crosses the Dorking-London road. Initially called Box Hill and now known as Dorking Deepdene, the new station was intended to cater to passengers from the Leatherhead area.

The first freight trains began running on the line in September 1850. Goods sheds opened at Gomshall and Betchworth the following year, and a shed was provided at Ash from 1856. The yard at Dorking, equipped with an 8-ton crane and cattle pens, served both the town and the Denbies estate.

=== Purchase by the SER and late 19th century ===
In October 1851, the SER applied to Parliament to take over the RG&RR. The purchase took effect in March 1852, although the authorising South Eastern and Reading, Guildford and Reigate Railways Amalgamation Act 1852 (15 & 16 Vict. c. ciii) was not given royal assent until 17 June 1852. Over the first few years of SER ownership, the financial performance of the line was poor. In 1855, the company stated that the line was losing £15,377 per annum (equivalent to £1.4 million in 2025), but the following year, the Railway Times estimated that the annual loss was around £30,000. Through trains from the GWR at Reading were introduced on 1 July 1863 with a daily Birkenhead to Dover return working, but disappointing passenger numbers resulted in the service being withdrawn in October 1868. In January 1869, there were five daily return services between Charing Cross and Reading, ten between Dorking and the capital, and one from Guildford. Passenger numbers from Dorking fell after the opening of the Leatherhead to Horsham line in 1867.

In the mid-1850s, Aldershot Military Town was established for the British Army in north-east Hampshire. In 1858, the SER opened North Camp station to serve the new camps. A goods yard was constructed at the station in 1859-60.

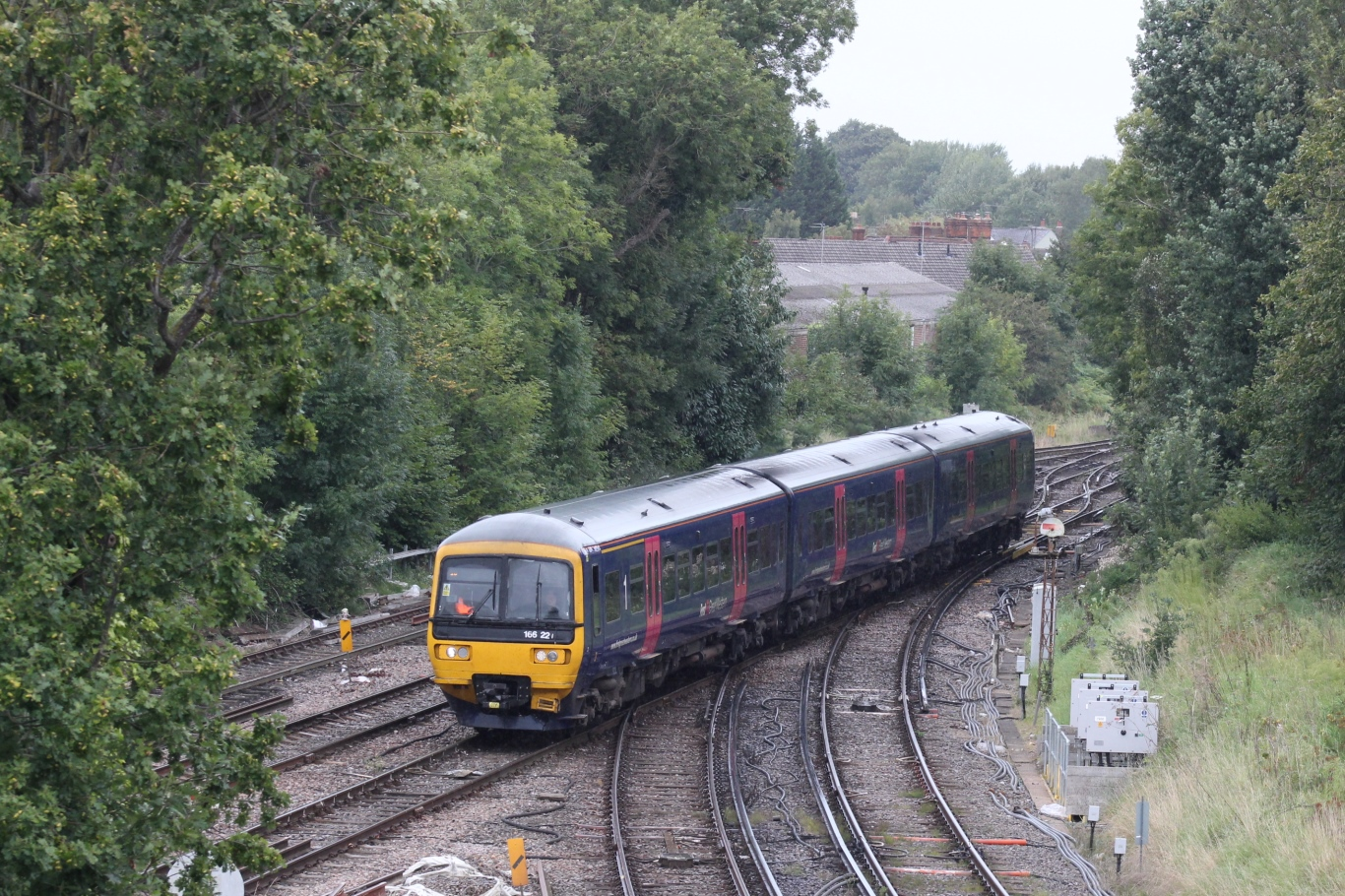
Wokingham Junction was created in 1856, when the line from Ascot opened. A Class 166 heads towards Guildford after departing from Wokingham station.

Several connections between the North Downs Line and other lines were created in the second half of the 19th century. The first was a 300 m (330 yd) single-track link running into the GWR station at Reading, which opened on 30 August 1855. The Staines, Wokingham and Woking Railway (SW&WR), which had been granted running powers over the Wokingham-Reading section in 1853, opened its line from Ascot on 9 July 1856. A second link at Reading, which passed under the Great Western Main Line and which was owned by the GWR and SW&WR, was opened to goods services on 1 December 1858 and to passenger trains on 17 January the following year. At Dorking, a single-track west-to-south spur joining the Leatherhead-Horsham line, was opened on 1 May 1867 but closed around the end of the century. The fourth link, a tight curve to the Alton line allowing SER trains from Ash to run into Aldershot station, was completed in 1879.

The uncompleted triangular junction with the Portsmouth Direct line in 1871: The red circle indicates the position of Shalford station.

The construction of the railway line from Godalming to Havant was completed in late 1858, although the first passenger services did not start running until January the following year. Since the line had been built on a speculative basis by the independent Portsmouth Railway (PR) company, it was unclear whether the LSWR would allow its trains to run over its line via Guildford and Woking to reach London. In July 1854, the PR gained authorisation to extend its line northwards from Godalming to Shalford, where it could join the North Downs Line. New embankments and a wooden trestle bridge across the River Wey were constructed by the SER to create a triangular junction at Shalford, providing an alternative route to the capital. However, before the link could be completed, the LSWR decided to allow PR trains to use its line, eliminating the immediate need for the connection. It is unclear whether track was ever laid over the spur, but the SER decided not to continue its work, fearing that completion would violate its long-standing agreement with the London, Brighton and South Coast Railway not to compete for traffic to Portsmouth.

=== 20th century ===
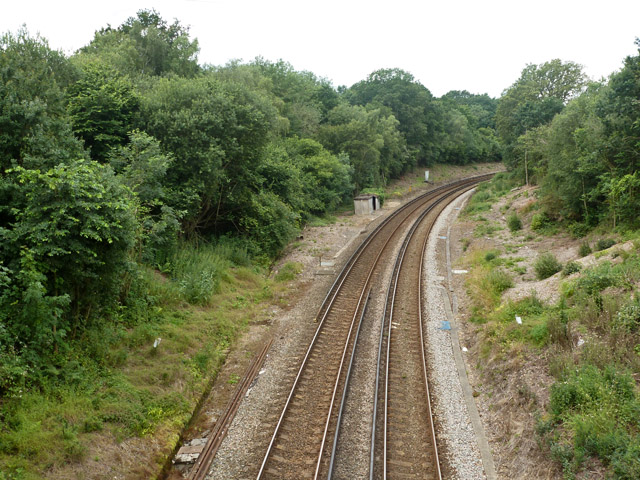
The former Ash Junction: The North Downs Line to Ash curves to the right, but the former line to Farnham via Tongham continued straight ahead.

As a result of the Railways Act 1921, the North Downs Line became part of the Southern Railway in 1923. Three parts of the line were electrified in the 1930s using the third-rail system. The 1.9 mi (3.1 km) section between Redhill and Reigate was electrified under the Brighton Main Line electrification programme. Electric trains began running in public service on 17 July 1932, with trains to and from Reigate splitting and joining at Redhill with trains to and from Three Bridges. The electrification of the Wokingham–Reading and Guildford–Ash sections was completed on 1 January 1939. (Note: The first electric trains ran over the Portsmouth Direct line between Guildford and Shalford Junction on 8 March 1937.) One further development to take place in the 1930s was the withdrawal of the passenger service on the former LSWR line between Ash Junction and Farnham via Tongham on 4 July 1937. Freight services on this route continued until final closure in 1961.

During the Second World War, the North Downs Line was fortified with additional earthworks, tank traps and pillboxes. A nine-road marshalling yard was built at Shalford and the link to the Dorking–Horsham line at Dorking was reinstated. (Note: The spur to the Dorking–Horsham line at Dorking, which had been removed c. 1900, was reinstated in Sept 1941 and was removed again in September 1950. The alignment was used for a housing development in 1970.) The North Downs Line played a major role in the transport of troops evacuated from Dunkirk in May and June 1940.

The first Beeching report, published in 1963, recommended shutting all stations between Shalford and Betchworth inclusive. Instead of the proposed partial closure, steam-hauled passenger trains were replaced by diesel multiple units in January 1965, although steam-hauled freight continued until the end of the decade. The final through services between London and Reading via Redhill (one train in each direction per day) were withdrawn at the same time. On 4 January that year, Class 206 units, nicknamed Tadpoles and officially designated 3R, began operating an hourly stopping service between Tonbridge and Reading, calling at all stations except Winnersh and Earley. The second Beeching report, which was published in February 1965, recommended that the whole of the North Downs Line should be developed as a trunk route for freight services.

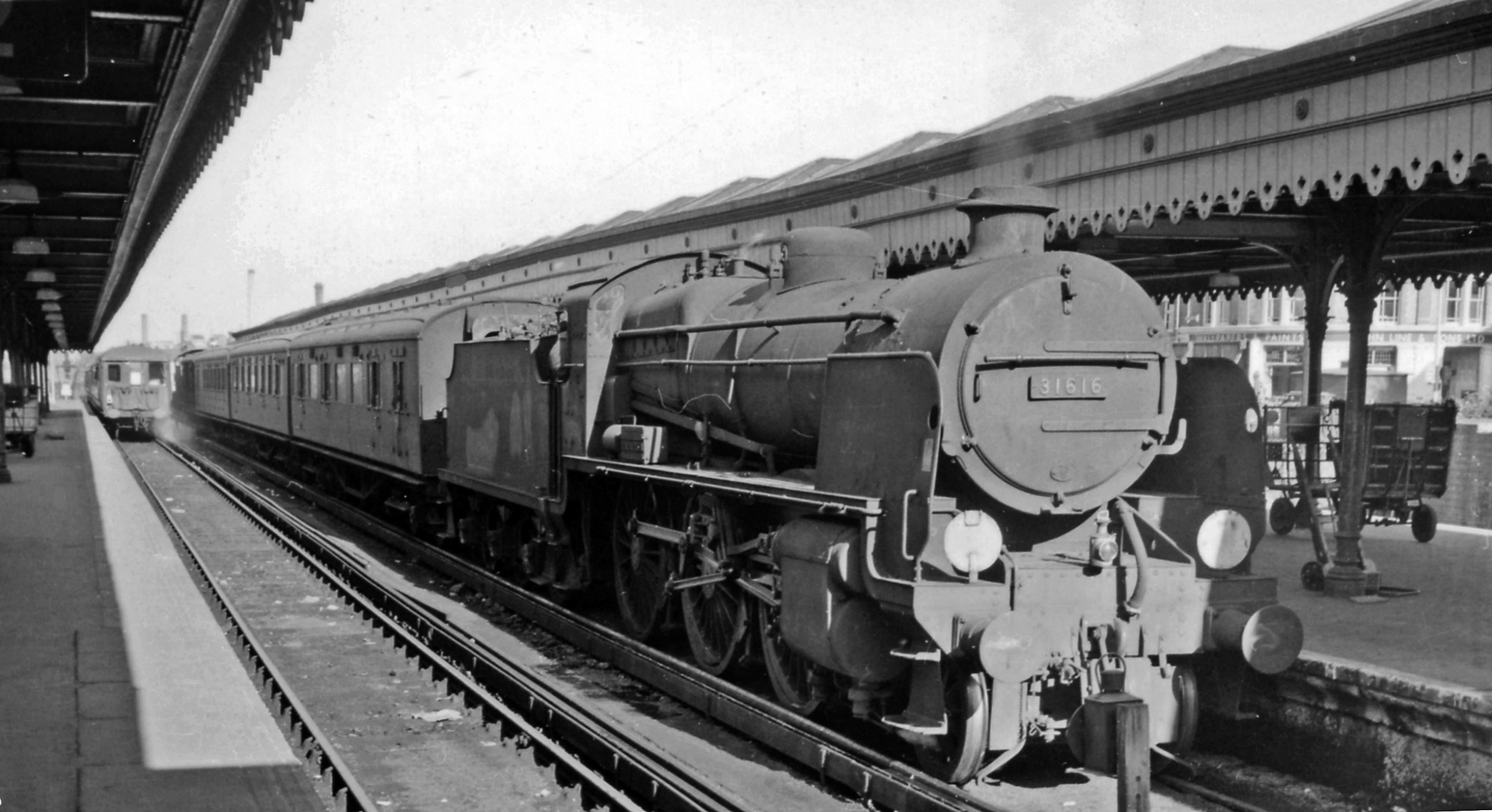
Reading Southern station in 1962: An electric multiple unit awaits its departure for London Waterloo (left) and a U class locomotive has just arrived from Redhill.

Reading Southern station closed on 6 September 1965 and all North Downs Line services were diverted to platform 4a at the main Reading station thereafter. Platform 4b at Reading opened in May 1975. In November 1967, full-time staff were removed from all stations on the line, with the exception of Redhill, Guildford and Reading. The change was made possible with the introduction of conductor-guards, with the ability to sell tickets, on all trains. An express service between Gatwick Airport and Reading began in May 1980, calling at North Camp, Guildford and Redhill. These trains began stopping at Dorking Deepdene in May 1986.

From 1982, the North Downs Line came under the control of Network SouthEast, one of the five business sectors of British Rail. (Note: Originally known as the London and South East sector, the name Network SouthEast was used from 10 June 1986.) In 1989, groups of lines in the sector were given names and identities; the Reading–Tonbridge and Reading–Gatwick airport services were branded the "North Downs Line" and the crest of the former Tonbridge Urban District Council was applied to the trains. In 1993, the Class 165 and 166 units were introduced. The reaction to the new trains was positive and, over the following 12 months, a 46% increase in passenger numbers was recorded for North Camp. Tonbridge remained the easternmost terminus for the North Downs Line services until the electrification of the Redhill–Tonbridge line in 1994, when the stopping services were cut back to Redhill.

=== 21st century ===
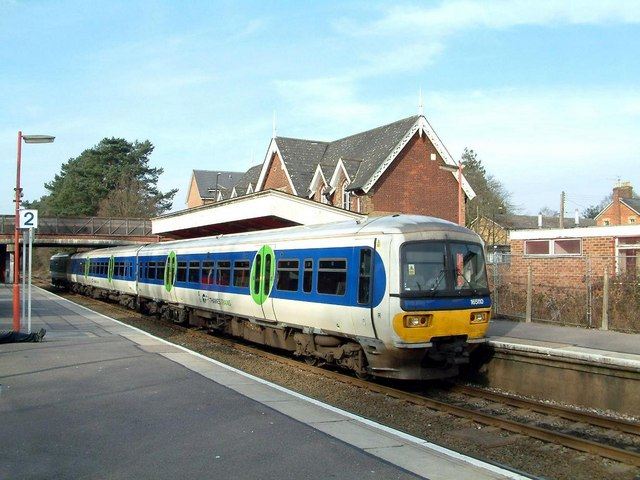
A Class 165 unit in Thames Trains livery at Crowthorne

As the result of the privatisation of British Rail, the North Downs Line was included in the Thames Trains franchise, won by the Go-Ahead Group in 1996. The franchise was awarded to FirstGroup in 2003 and trains were branded "First Great Western Link" for the next two years. In 2006, the former Thames Trains operations became part of the Greater Western franchise, won by FirstGroup.

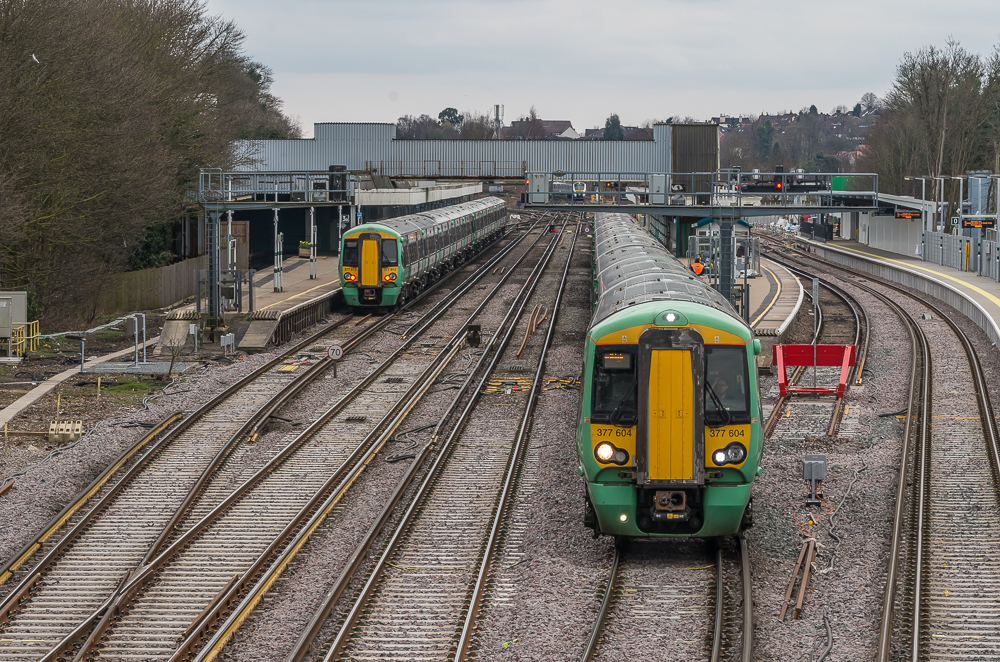
Redhill station from the north: the new Platform 0 is on the far right

In the 2010s, additional platforms were opened at Reading, Redhill and Gatwick Airport stations, to increase capacity for trains using the North Downs Line and other passenger services. A major project to renew the signals in the Wokingham area and to transfer control of the north-western part of the line to the Basingstoke rail operations centre was completed in February 2024.

Several foot crossings were replaced by bridges in the early 21st century, including at Gomshall station in 2016, Shere Heath in 2021 and Farnborough North station in 2025. Chester Bridge, which carries the A323 over the railway, opened in February 2025, allowing the level crossing to the south of Ash station to be closed to vehicles.

== Passenger services and rolling stock ==
=== Current ===
The main services on the North Downs Line are provided by GWR using Class 165 and Class 166 Networker Turbo diesel multiple units. There is a half-hourly service between Reading and Gatwick Airport via Guildford, with alternate services running semi-fast either side of Guildford. At Redhill, the Gatwick Airport services reverse to head south along the Brighton Main Line. A total of seven diesel multiple units is required to run the GWR Reading–Gatwick Airport service. (Note: Until 1994, the Reading–Redhill stopping services continued to Tonbridge, but the line between Redhill and Tonbridge was electrified in 1993. Trains on this section are now operated by Southern.) In 2026, GWR introduced a night time service between Reading and Gatwick for passengers taking early flights.

Services on the North Downs Line are provided by South Western Railway between Reading and Wokingham (trains to/from London Waterloo, operated by Class 458 and Class 701 units), and between Ash and Guildford (trains to/from Aldershot and Farnham operated by Class 450 units).

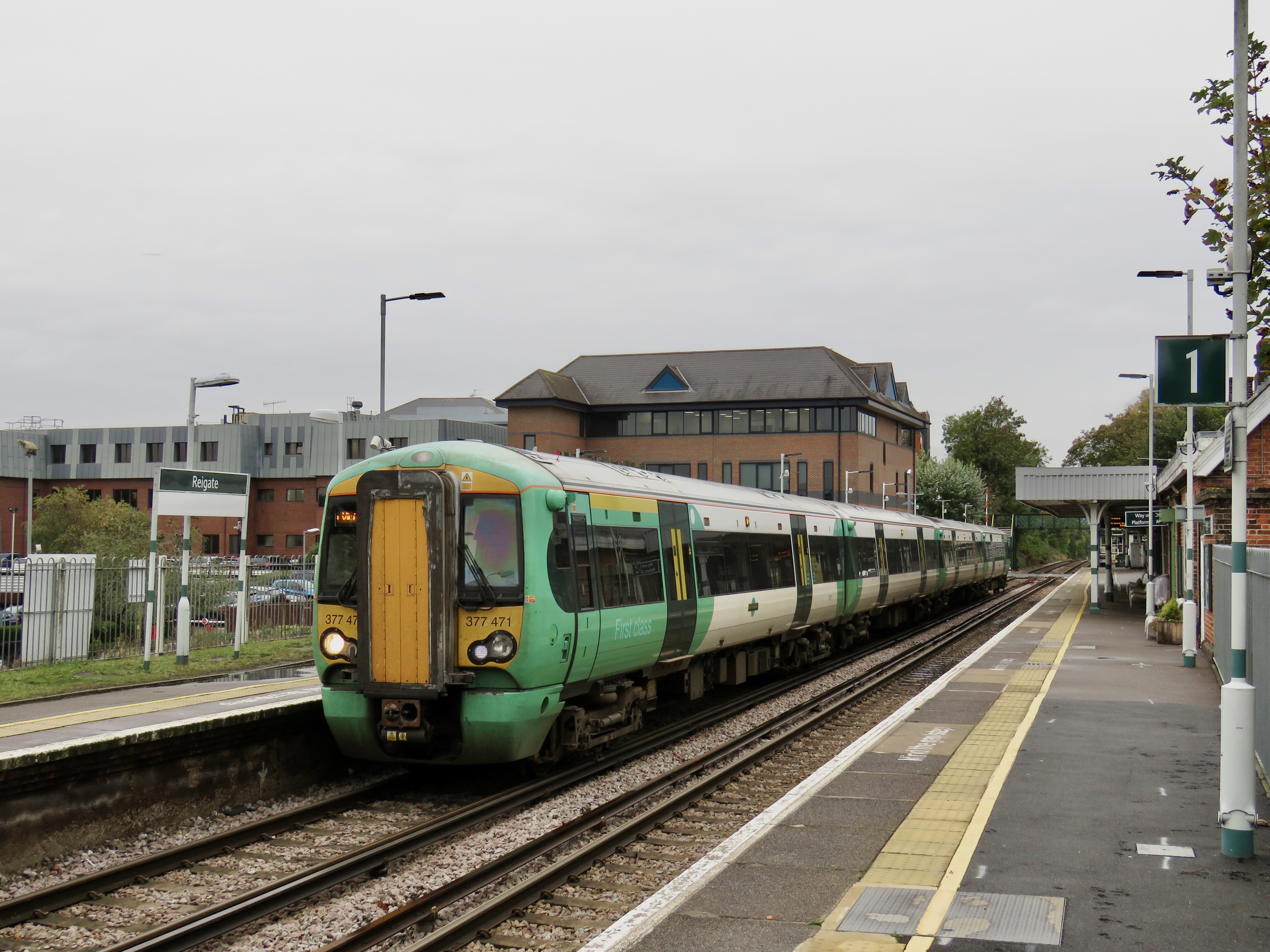
A Class 377 unit at Reigate station with a Southern service to London Victoria

Southern operates frequent services using four-car electric multiple units between Reigate and London Victoria. These trains use the North Downs Line between Reigate and Redhill, where they join the Brighton Main Line.

=== Former ===
The earliest locomotives to be used on the North Downs Line are thought to have been SER 2-4-0 engines, designed by James Cudworth. A Nasmyth and Gaskell 0-6-0 and a Hick 2-4-0 are known to have worked the line in the mid-1850s. E class 2-4-0 locomotives were introduced in the early 1860s and hauled passenger services until the end of the 19th century. James Stirling, who was appointed locomotive superintendent at the SER in 1878, introduced F class 4-4-0 engines to the line in 1897. From 1902, Q class 0-4-4T tank engines were used and are known to have worked the Ash-Aldershot shuttle services.

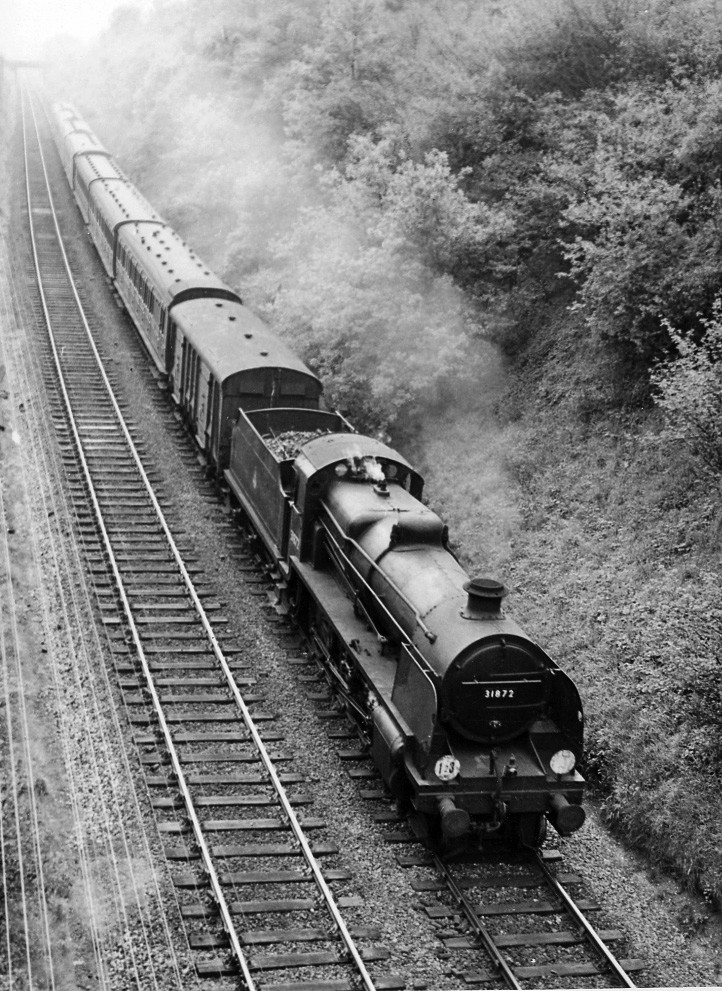
An SECR N class locomotive climbs towards Gomshall in 1957.

Traffic increased during the First World War, with additional trains serving the army camps at Aldershot. GWR 3300 class "Bulldogs" and 3252 class "Dukes" were deployed to the line, supplemented by 15 Great Northern Railway 2-4-0 locomotives. In 1924, Maunsell N class steam engines began hauling passenger trains, and P Class 0-6-0 tank engines took over the Ash-Aldershot shuttle at around the same time. In the 1930s, the majority of services were worked by F1 and D class 4-4-0s, and H class 0-4-4Ts. In 1938, ex-GWR 2-6-0 and 4-6-0 engines moved to the North Downs Line and continued to haul trains until the 1960s.

Traffic increased again during the Second World War. Between 27 May and 4 June 1940, troops evacuated from Dunkirk were transported via the line and civilian services were suspended to allow these trains to run. In the same year a new cross-country service between Newcastle and Ashford, Kent, primarily for military personnel, was introduced on the line. It ran until the end of 1944, when the southern terminus was changed to Southampton Docks.

In the 1950s, the majority of passenger trains were hauled by Maunsell N and U class locomotives, supplemented towards the end of the decade by Standard Class 4 tender and tank engines. From 1959 onwards, electrification schemes in Kent allowed LSWR N15 class "King Arthurs" and SR V class "Schools" steam engines to be transferred to the line. Class 33 diesel-electric locomotives began hauling trains in 1962. The final, scheduled, steam-hauled passenger service on the North Downs Line departed Reading Southern for Guildford on the evening of 3 January 1965, although a few steam-hauled freight services continued until the end of steam operation on the Southern Region in July 1967.

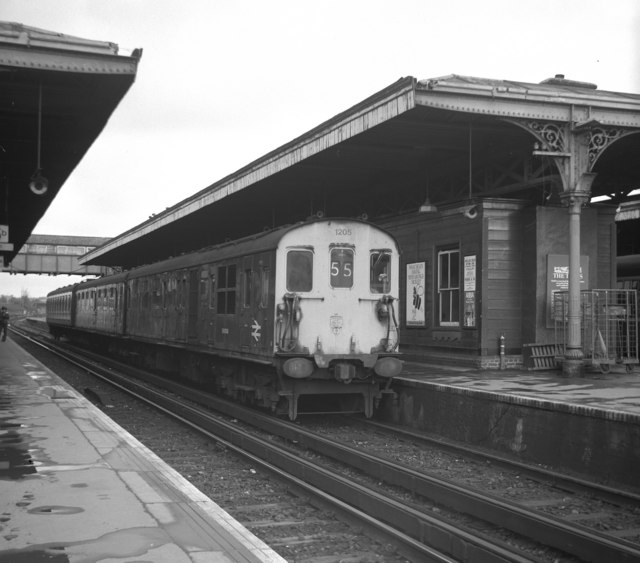
3R (Class 206) unit at Guildford in 1979

A new timetable was introduced on 4 January 1965, with 3R (Class 206) diesel-electric multiple units operating an hourly, all-stations service between Reading and Tonbridge. The new trains consisted of two 6S (Class 201) coaches from the Hastings Line coupled to an adapted 2-EPB driving trailer coach. As a result of the visible difference in width between the narrow Hastings Line stock and the standard-width trailer, the units were nicknamed Tadpoles. The Class 33 diesel locomotives, introduced to the line in 1962, continued to haul peak hour services until May 1977.

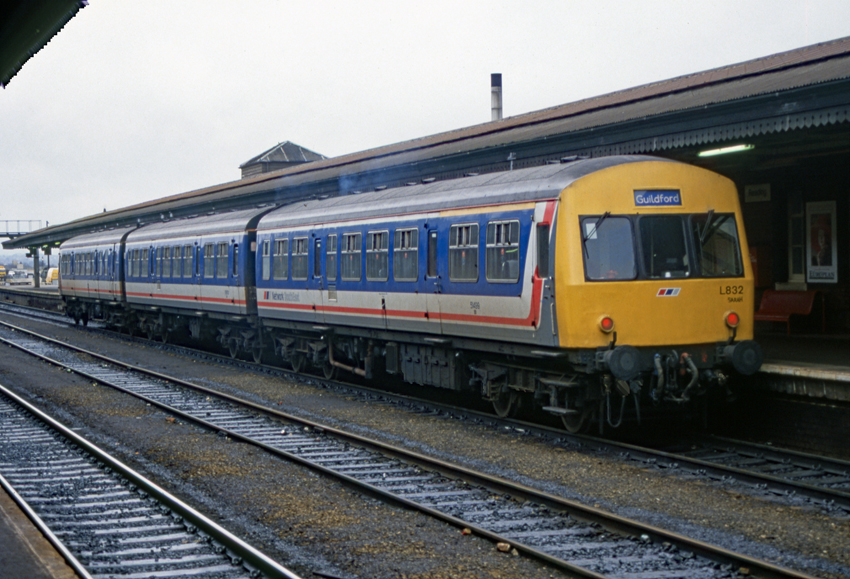
A Class 101 unit in Network SouthEast livery at Reading with a service to Guildford in 1991

Three-car Class 119 units were introduced to the North Downs Line in April 1979 enabling the withdrawal of the Tadpoles in May 1981. The express service from Reading to Gatwick Airport was launched on 12 May 1980. The Class 119 units were especially modified for this service, and the buffet counter in the centre coach was removed to create extra luggage space. Initially the service called at North Camp, Guildford and Redhill, but it began stopping at Dorking Deepdene in May 1986. Three-car Class 101 units were later used on the route as well. The Class 119 and 101 units were replaced by Class 165 and 166 units in 1993.

Class 456 units were introduced to the North Downs Line on 23 March 2014, when they began operating between Ascot and Guildford via Aldershot. They were withdrawn from passenger service by SWR on 15 January 2022. In 2018, GWR announced that it would lease Class 769 hybrid multiple units for use on the North Downs Line and on other services in the Thames Valley. In 2022, the company decided not to pursue plans to introduce the Class 769 fleet and stated that all units were to be returned to the lessor.

== Freight services ==
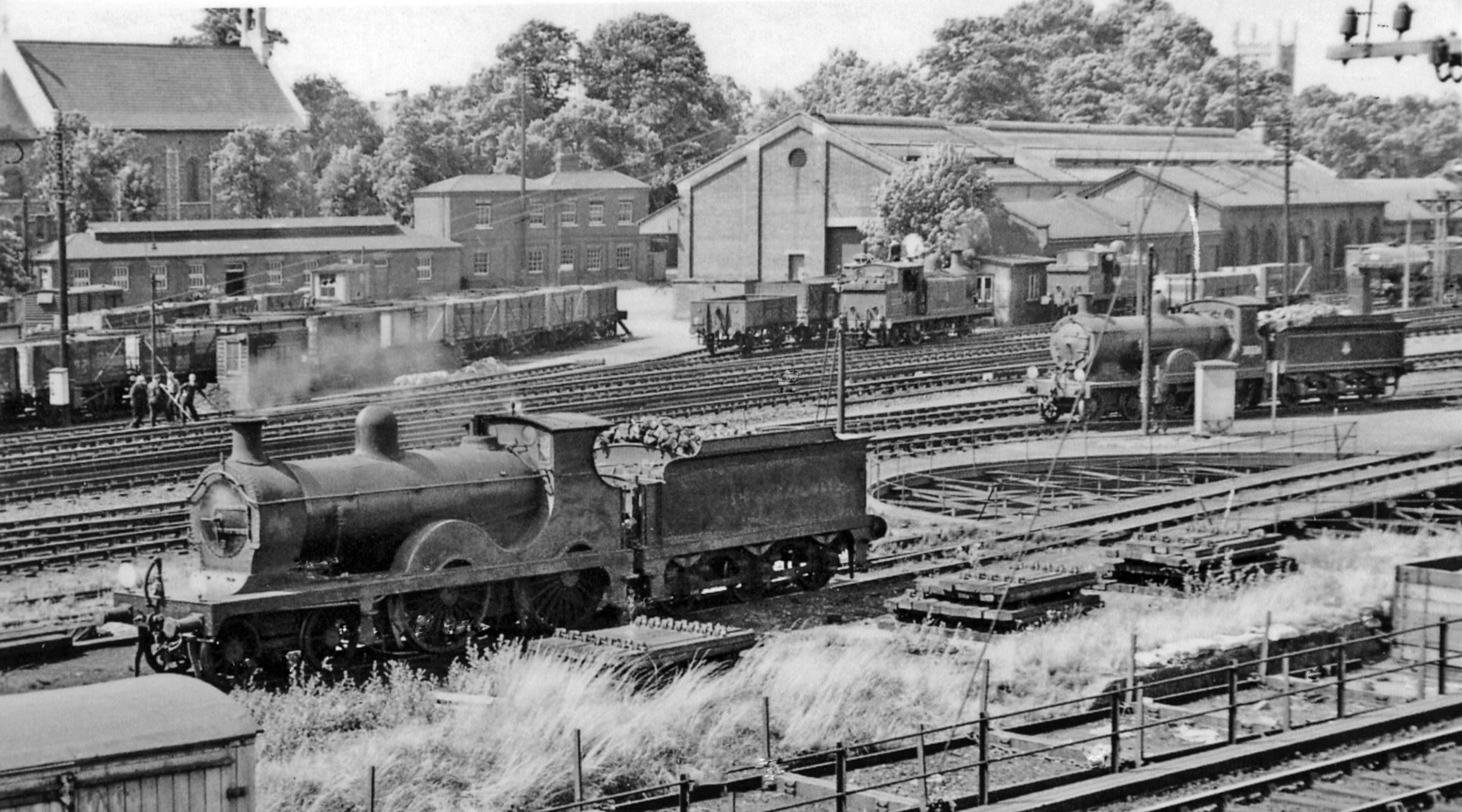
Reading Southern goods yard in 1953 with St James's Church (top left)

The first goods trains began running on the North Downs Line in September 1850 and facilities for handling freight were provided at most stations. Goods sheds opened at Gomshall and Betchworth the following year, and a shed was provided at Ash from 1856. The yard at Dorking, equipped with an 8-ton crane and cattle pens, served both the town and the Denbies estate. The permanent goods yard at Reading Southern opened on 1 December 1858, replacing a temporary facility to the east that had opened with the line in 1849. The yard was used for goods services in February 1970. Most of the station yards on the line closed in the 1960s.

There were four major narrow-gauge railway systems linked to the line. The Chilworth gunpowder and cordite works, active until the end of the First World War, had an 800 mm (2 ft 7 1/2 in) railway. At Dorking West station, there was a British Timber Works narrow gauge railway, active between the 1910s and 1930s. Brockham Limeworks and Brickworks, to the east of Dorking, was connected to the North Downs Line by a standard-gauge siding but also had a small 2 ft (610 mm) system. Betchworth quarry and limeworks, which operated between 1865 and 1963, had an extensive system with four different track gauges.

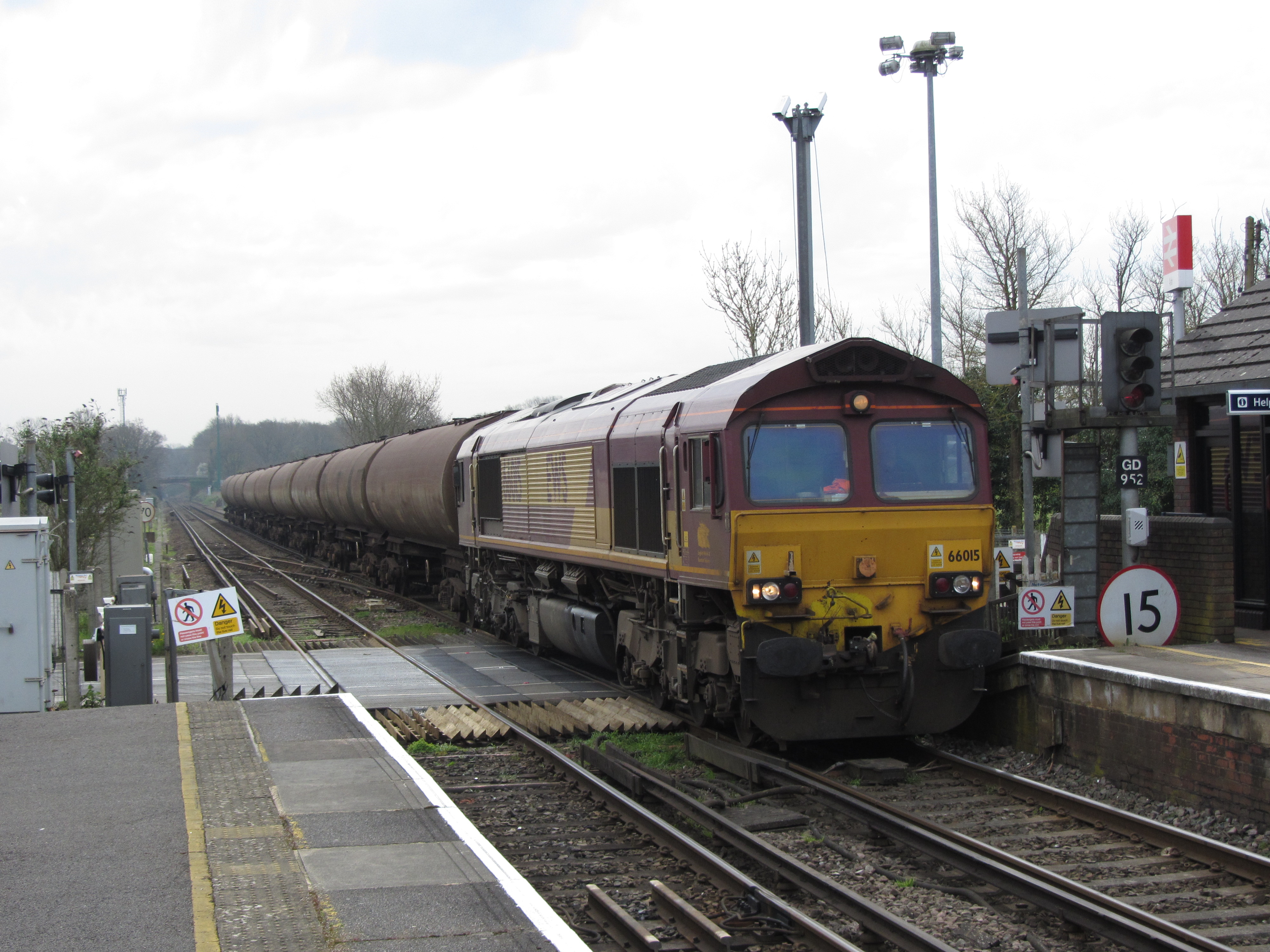
A Class 66 locomotive hauls a freight train through Ash in 2014

The travelling post office train from Dover to Manchester Piccadilly via Tonbridge, Redhill, Guildford and Reading was routed along the line from May 1988 until 1996, when a new road and rail postal hub opened at Willesden. The Network Rail 2008 Strategic Business Plan recommended an enhancement project to enable freight traffic from the Channel Tunnel to use the line. In 2023, there were no regular scheduled freight services on the North Downs Line.

== Future ==
=== Electrification ===
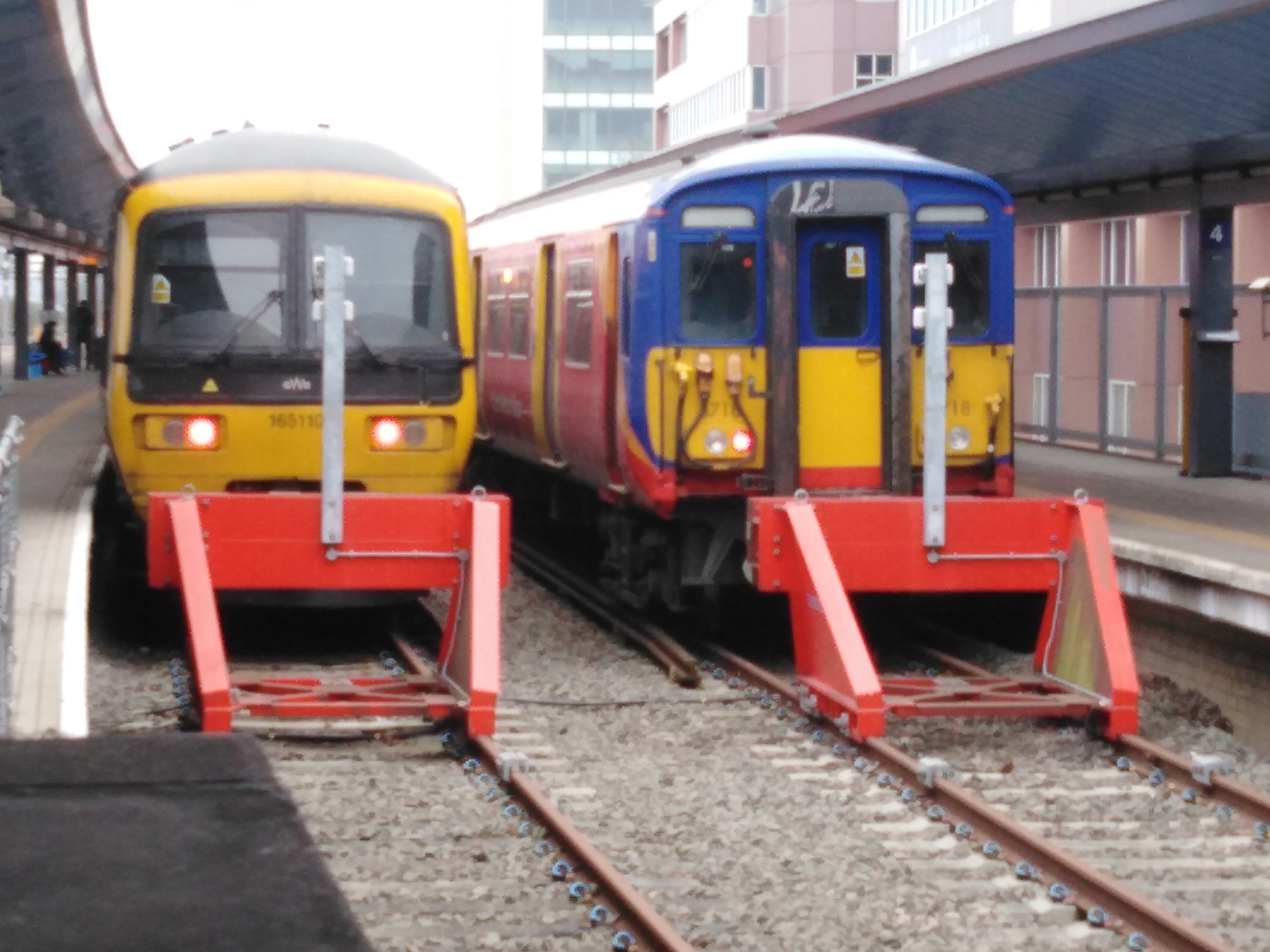
Class 165 and 455 units at the third-rail electrified platforms at Reading

Three sections of the North Downs Line were electrified by the Southern Railway in the 1930s, but around 29 mi (47 km) remains unelectrified. There have been several proposals to either extend the electrified sections or to completely electrify the remainder. A study for Surrey County Council, published in two parts in 1995 and 1996, recommended that the Dorking–Reigate section be electrified and a north–east link from the Mole Valley Line be built, to enable a loop service to operate via Epsom, Redhill and East Croydon. (Note: The necessary land for a north–east link between the Mole Valley Line and North Downs Line at Dorking was purchased by the SER. Parliamentary approval was obtained in 1924 and 1927, but the link was never built.)

The "Surrey Rail Strategy", published in 2015, noted that infill electrification of the remaining unelectrified sections using the DC third-rail system would reduce the journey time between Reading and Gatwick Airport by 2 1/2 minutes for fast services and by 7 minutes for stopping trains. Overhead electrification of the line would reduce the journey time by 5 minutes for fast services and by 11 minutes for stopping trains. The following year, Surrey County Council suggested that electrification of the full length of the North Downs Line would create around 8,000 jobs and would stimulate £1.9 billion of economic growth, based on research by four local enterprise partnerships.

The "North Downs Line Traction Decarbonisation Strategy", published by Network Rail in 2024, evaluated the costs and benefits of completely electrifying the route. It noted that third-rail infill offered poor value for money and proposed that battery-powered electric trains should be procured when the Class 165 and 166 units are withdrawn. Whilst introducing a third train per hour between Reading and Redhill would allow stops to be removed from Reading–Gatwick services, it would deliver only a marginal improvement in the financial performance of the line.

=== Other potential developments ===
The "Blackwater Valley Rail Survey", published in 1991, suggested replacing the station at Farnborough North with an interchange station where the South West Main Line crosses the North Downs Line. This option was dismissed in the 1995/6 Surrey County Council reports as it was thought that the stopping train frequencies on the two lines would be too low for suitable connections. The 1995/6 reports also proposed a new station at Park Barn to serve the Royal Surrey County Hospital and the University of Surrey. A local newspaper report in 2019, suggested that the new station, in north-west Guildford, could open in the mid-2020s. The 1995/6 Surrey County Council reports also suggested that the line could form the core of a rail link between Heathrow and Gatwick Airports.

== Accidents and incidents ==
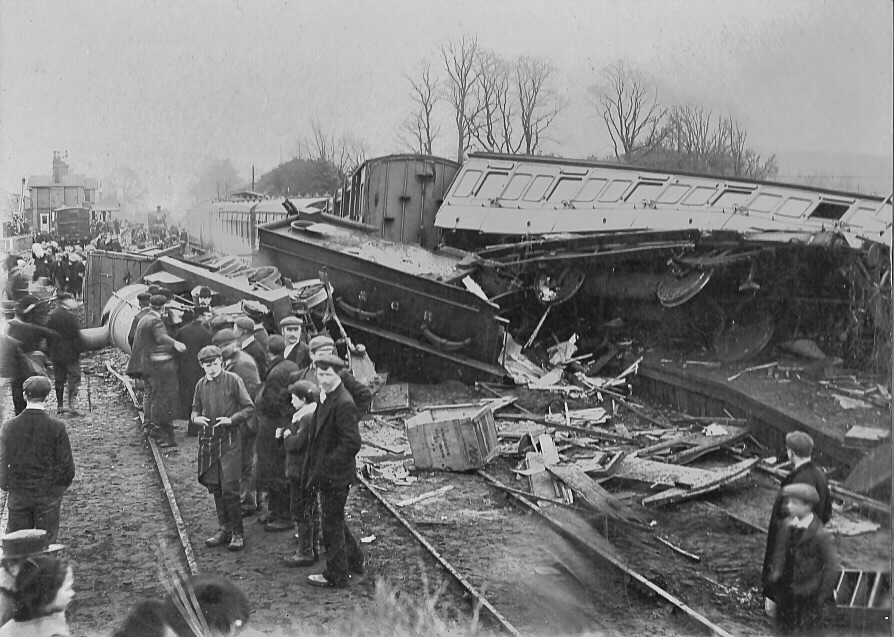
The wreckage of the accident at Gomshall on 20 February 1904

- 19 June 1853: An SER passenger train from Reading to Reigate ran into the back of a Godalming-bound goods train in one of the tunnels south of Guildford.
- 12 September 1855: A light engine, which had departed from Reading, was misrouted into the path of a train from Charing Cross via Guildford and collided with it head on. Three passengers and the driver of the light engine were killed. One further passenger later died of their injuries.
- 17 January 1867: An LSWR passenger train from Alton ran into the back of an SER train from Reading about 300 yd (270 m) north-west of Guildford station. There were no fatalities.
- 18 January 1868: An SER train for Redhill derailed shortly after leaving Reigate, due to a landslip. The locomotive overturned, the first carriage was destroyed and the second carriage was slewed across the tracks. There were no fatalities.
- 8 September 1882: George White, a shunter employed by the SER, was struck and killed at Reigate by a non-stopping express train to London. He had been loading a horse into a horsebox attached to a Reading-bound train that had stopped at the station.
- 29 February 1892: Henry Wicks, a guard employed by the SER, was killed on the line between Chilworth and Gomshall. A coupling between two trucks broke and the rear portion, in which he was working, rolled backwards downhill at speed. He was thrown out of the guard's van and onto the embankment. A box hedge topiary, known as Jessie's Seat, has been cut in the shape of a pheasant as a memorial to Wicks.
- 9 November 1901: A fireman was run over and killed in thick fog by a non-stopping train at Blackwater, while attempting to extinguish a burning sleeper.
- 20 February 1904: A locomotive hauling a train carrying around 150 members of the Royal Northumberland Fusiliers, bound for service in Mauritius, derailed at Gomshall station. There were no fatalities, but three soldiers, the driver and fireman were severely injured. The accident occurred while the train was travelling at around 35 mph (56 km/h) and is thought to have been caused by a track defect.
- 11 April 1944: Two goods trains, one of which consisted of tankers of aviation fuel en route to airfields in Kent, collided at Shalford. The resulting fire damaged the steel road bridge over the railway.

== Listed buildings ==
There are three Grade II listed structures on the North Downs Line.

Name	Location	Type	Completed (Note: The completion date given is the date used by Historic England as significant for the initial building of all or part of the structure)	Date listed	Coordinates	Image	Ref.
Level Crossing cottage	Buckland, Surrey	cottage	1848	18 August 1996	51.2505°N 0.2546°W		
Footbridge immediately south of Wokingham Station	Wokingham, Berkshire	footbridge	late 19th century	16 June 1996	51.4109°N 0.8425°W		
Railway overbridge at NGR SU 7770 7109, Arbor Lane	Winnersh, Berkshire	rail bridge over road	1848	28 April 1987	51.4333°N 0.8838°W		

== See also ==
- Great Western Main Line
- Waterloo–Reading line
- Alton line
- Portsmouth Direct line
- Mole Valley line
- Brighton Main Line
- Redhill–Tonbridge line

== Bibliography ==
- Beeching, Richard (27 March 1963a). The Reshaping of British Railways Part 1: Report. London: HMSO.
- Beeching, Richard (27 March 1963b). The Reshaping of British Railways Part 2: Maps. London: HMSO.
- Beeching, Richard (16 February 1965). The Development of the Major Railway Trunk Routes. London: HMSO.
- Bridge, Mike, ed. (2017). TRACKatlas of Mainland Britain (3rd ed.). Sheffield: Platform 5. ISBN 978-1-90-943126-3.
- Brown, David (2010). Main Line Electrification, the War Years and British Railways. Southern Electric. Vol. 2. Crowthorne: Capital Transport Publishing. ISBN 978-1-85-414340-2.
- Brown, David; Jackson, Alan A. (1990). Network SouthEast Handbook. Harrow Weald: Capital Transport Publishing. ISBN 978-1-85-414129-3.
- Cole, Howard N. (1980). The Story of Aldershot : A History of the Civil and Military Towns. Southern Books. ISBN 978-0-95-071470-7.
- Course, Edwin, ed. (1987). Minutes of the Board of Directors of the Reading, Guildford and Reigate Railway Company. Guildford: Surrey Record Society. ISBN 978-0-90-297808-9.
- Bussell, Stephen; Bennett, Stephen; Bransby, Hal (12 June 2015). "Surrey Rail Strategy : North Downs Line Assessment" (PDF). Surrey County Council. Archived (PDF) from the original on 20 January 2022.
- Gray, Adrian (1990). South Eastern Railway. Midhurst: Middleton Press. ISBN 978-0-90-652085-7.
- Green, Chris; Vincent, Mike (2014). The Network SouthEast story. Hersham: Ian Allan Ltd. ISBN 978-0-86-093653-4.
- Jackson, Alan A. (1988). Dorking's Railways. Dorking: Dorking Local History Group. ISBN 978-1-87-091201-3.
- Jackson, Alan A. (1999). The Railway in Surrey. Penryn: Atlantic Transport Publishers. ISBN 978-0-90-689990-8.
- Janaway, John (1987). Yesterday's Town : Godalming. Buckingham: Barracuda Books. ISBN 978-0-86-023291-9.
- Kidner, R.W. (1974). The Reading to Tonbridge Line. Headington: Oakwood Press. ISBN 978-0-85-361156-1.
- Mitchell, Vic; Smith, Keith (1988). Reading to Guildford. Midhurst: Middleton Press. ISBN 978-0-90-652047-5.
- Mitchell, Vic; Smith, Keith (1989). Guildford to Redhill. Midhurst: Middleton Press. ISBN 978-0-90-652063-5.
- Oppitz, Leslie (1988). Surrey Railways Remembered. Newbury: Countryside Books. ISBN 978-1-85-306005-2.
- Quick, Michael (2023) [2001]. Railway Passenger Stations in Great Britain (PDF) (5.05 ed.). London: Railway and Canal Historical Society.
- Rose, David (2016). Guildford Pubs. Stroud: Amberley Publishing. ISBN 978-1-44-565719-6.
- Waters, Laurence (1990). Rail Centres: Reading. Shepperton: Ian Allan Ltd. ISBN 978-0-71-101937-9.
- White, H.P. (1961). Southern England. A Regional History of the Railways of Great Britain. Vol. 2. Phoenix House.
- Williams, R. A. (1968). The London & South Western Railway. Vol. 1: The Formative Years. Newton Abbot: David & Charles. ISBN 0-7153-4188-X.
- Williams, R. A. (1973). The London & South Western Railway. Vol. 2: Growth and Consolidation. Newton Abbot: David & Charles. ISBN 0-7153-5940-1.
- Yonge, John (November 2008) [1994]. Jacobs, Gerald (ed.). Railway Track Diagrams 5: Southern & TfL (3rd ed.). Bradford on Avon: Trackmaps. ISBN 978-0-9549866-4-3.
- "Kent / Sussex / Wessex Routes Sectional Appendix" (PDF). Network Rail. 2009.
- "Delivering a better railway for a better Britain | Route Specifications: Wessex" (PDF). Network Rail. 2016.
