= Shalford railway station =

Railway station in Surrey, England

Shalford
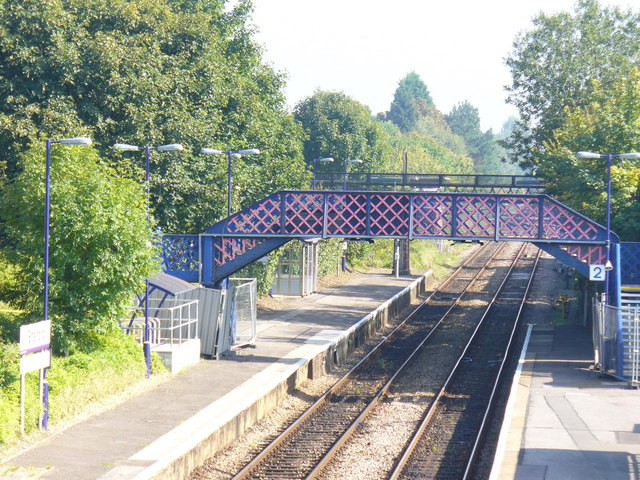

General information
- Location: Shalford, Surrey, Guildford; England
- Coordinates: 51°12′50″N 0°34′01″W
- Grid reference: TQ002471
- Manager: Great Western Railway
- Platforms: 2

Other information
- Station code: SFR
- Classification: DfT category F2

History
- Opened: 20 August 1849
- Original company: Reading, Guildford and Reigate Railway
- Pre-grouping: South Eastern Railway
- Post-grouping: Southern Railway

Passengers
- 2020/21: ▼19,330
- 2021/22: ▲54,450
- 2022/23: ▲75,132
- 2023/24: ▲85,172
- 2024/25: ▲95,490
Location
Notes
- Passenger statistics from the Office of Rail and Road

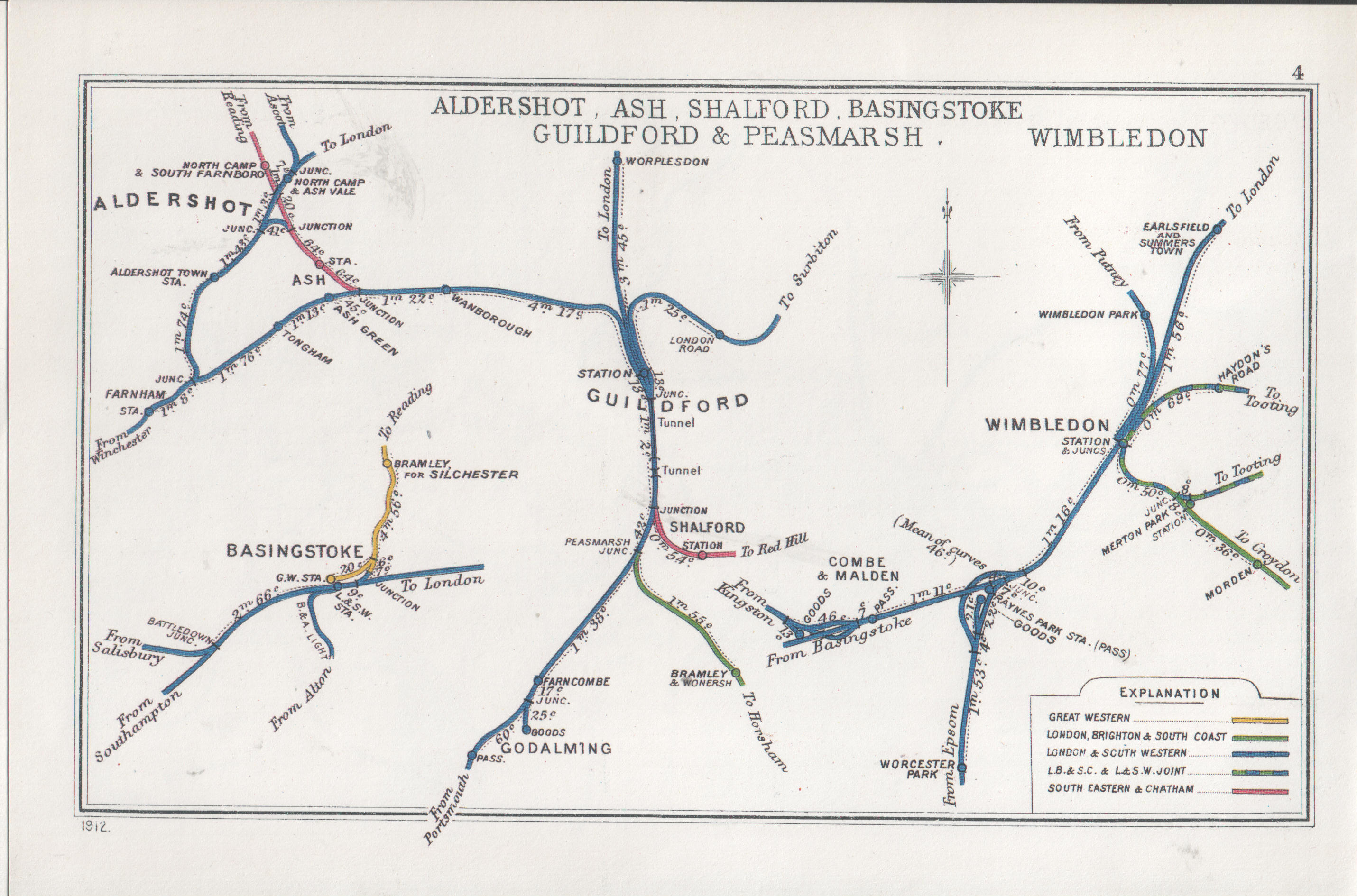
A 1912 Railway Clearing House map of lines around Shalford railway station

Shalford railway station serves the village of Shalford, Surrey, England. The station, and all trains serving it, are operated by Great Western Railway. It is on the North Downs Line. The station is 41 miles 2 chains (66.0 km) from Charing Cross, and has two platforms, which can each accommodate a six-coach train. To the west is Shalford Junction, 41 miles 60 chains (67.2 km) from Charing Cross, where the North Downs Line meets the Portsmouth Direct Line 31 miles 42 chains (50.7 km) from Waterloo (via Woking).

== History ==
In 1940, Shalford was a sub-control centre coordinating the evacuation trains dispersing the soldiers brought back from Dunkirk.

On 11 April 1944 two goods trains collided at Shalford Station. One of them consisted of tankers of aviation fuel en route to airfields in Kent. Leaks from the damaged wagons caused a major fire which was eventually brought under control by the fire brigade, with assistance of members of the local police and Home Guard volunteers, who used sandbags to contain the spread of the burning fuel. Nearby properties, including a potato and vegetable store, were badly damaged as was the steel road bridge over the railway that was buckled by the heat. The local pub, the Queen Victoria, escaped unharmed.

== Services ==
All services at Shalford are operated by Great Western Railway using Class 165 and 166 DMUs.

The typical off-peak service is one train per hour in each direction between Reading via Guildford and Gatwick Airport. During the peak hours, the service is increased to two trains per hour in each direction.

On Sundays, eastbound services at the station run only as far as Redhill.

Preceding station	National Rail	Following station
Chilworth	Great Western Railway North Downs Line	Guildford
