= Farnborough North railway station =

Railway station in Hampshire, England

Farnborough North
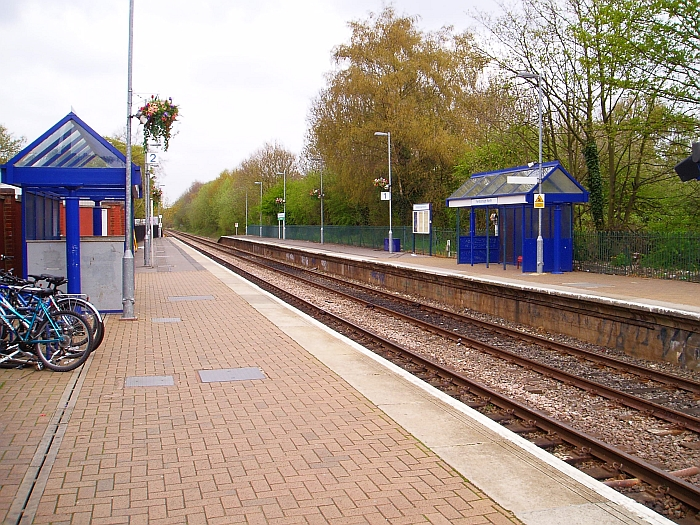

General information
- Location: Farnborough, Rushmoor, England
- Coordinates: 51.302°N 0.743°W
- Grid reference: SU877566
- Manager: Great Western Railway
- Platforms: 2

Other information
- Station code: FNN
- Classification: DfT category F1

History
- Original company: South Eastern Railway
- Pre-grouping: South Eastern and Chatham Railway
- Post-grouping: Southern Railway

Key dates
- 4 July 1849: Opened as Farnborough
- 9 July 1923: Renamed Farnborough North

Passengers
- 2021/22: ▲0.327 million
- Interchange: ▲1,857
- 2022/23: ▲0.419 million
- Interchange: ▲2,150
- 2023/24: ▲0.446 million
- Interchange: ▼1,368
- 2024/25: ▲0.483 million
- 2025/26: ▼0.467 million
Location
Notes
- Passenger statistics from the Office of Rail and Road

Farnborough North is a railway station that serves the town of Farnborough, in Hampshire, England. It is managed by Great Western Railway, which operates services on the North Downs Line between Reading, Guildford, Redhill and Gatwick Airport. It is one of two stations in the town; the other, Farnborough (Main), lies on the South West Main Line and is considerably busier.

== History ==
The Reading, Guildford and Reigate Railway (RG&RR) was authorised in 1846 and opened in stages. One of the first two sections to open was between Reading Southern and Farnborough on 4 July 1849. Originally named Farnborough, the station was renamed Farnborough North on 9 July 1923.

On 17 April 1860, the bare-knuckle world championship between Tom Sayers, champion of England, and John C. Heenan, champion of the USA, took place in a field just east of the station. The fighters and vast crowd had arrived by train from London.

== Facilities ==
The station has a self-service ticket machine, a very small car park and waiting shelters on each platform. There is a footbridge with lifts providing step-free access to both platforms. There is, however, no staffed ticket office and no waiting room.

== Services ==
All services at Farnborough North are operated by Great Western Railway using Classes 165 and 166 diesel multiple units.

The typical off-peak service is one train per hour in each direction between Reading and Gatwick Airport, via Guildford. During peak hours, the service is increased to two trains per hour in each direction. On Sundays, eastbound services at the station run only as far as Redhill.

Preceding station	National Rail	Following station
North Camp	Great Western Railway North Downs Line	Blackwater
