= Ash Cemetery, Surrey =

Cemetery in South East England

Coordinates: 51°15′01″N 0°42′58″W

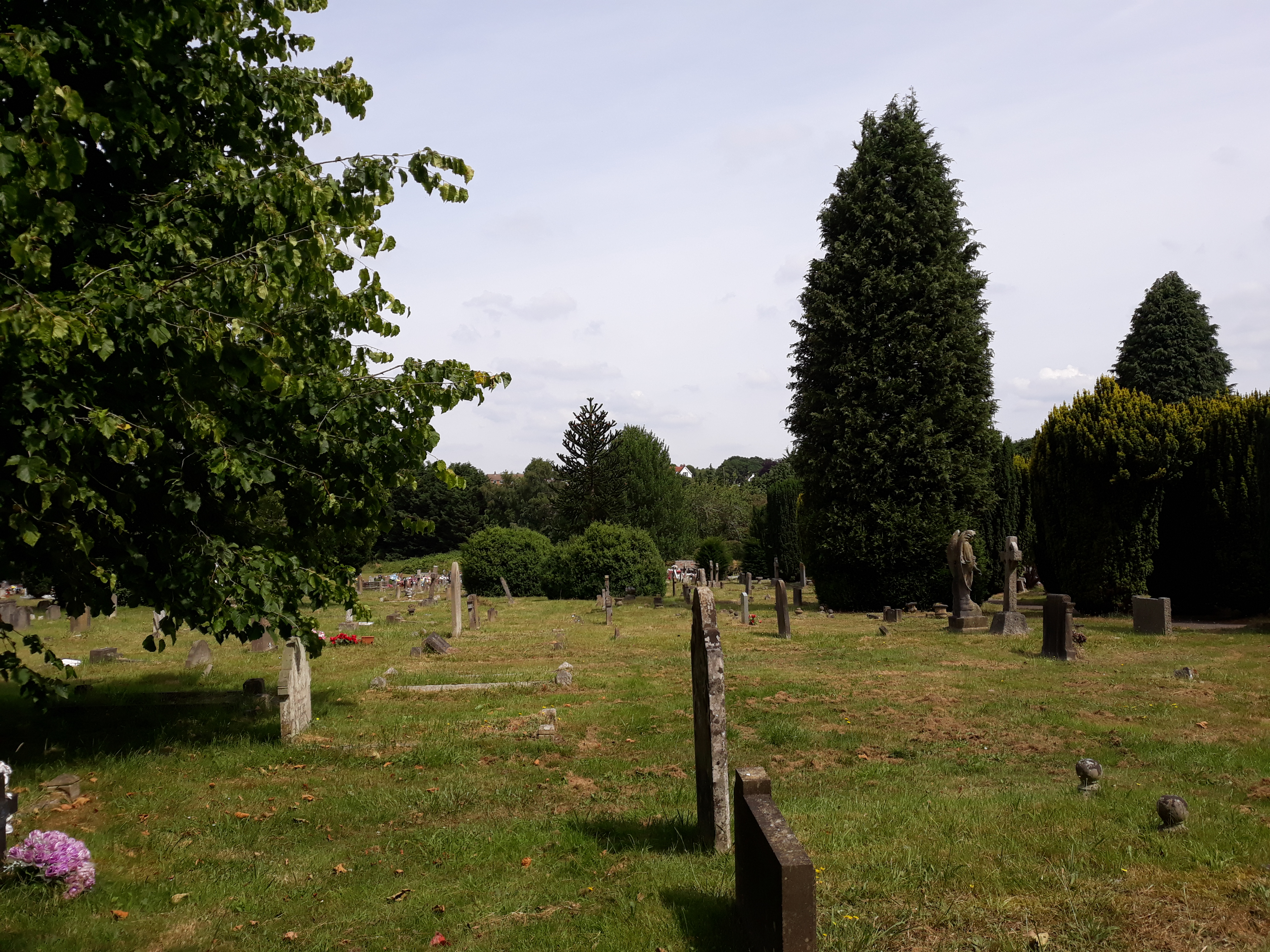
View of Ash Cemetery

Ash Cemetery, also known as Emery Gates Cemetery on Church Road is the burial ground for the village of Ash in Surrey, England.

== History ==
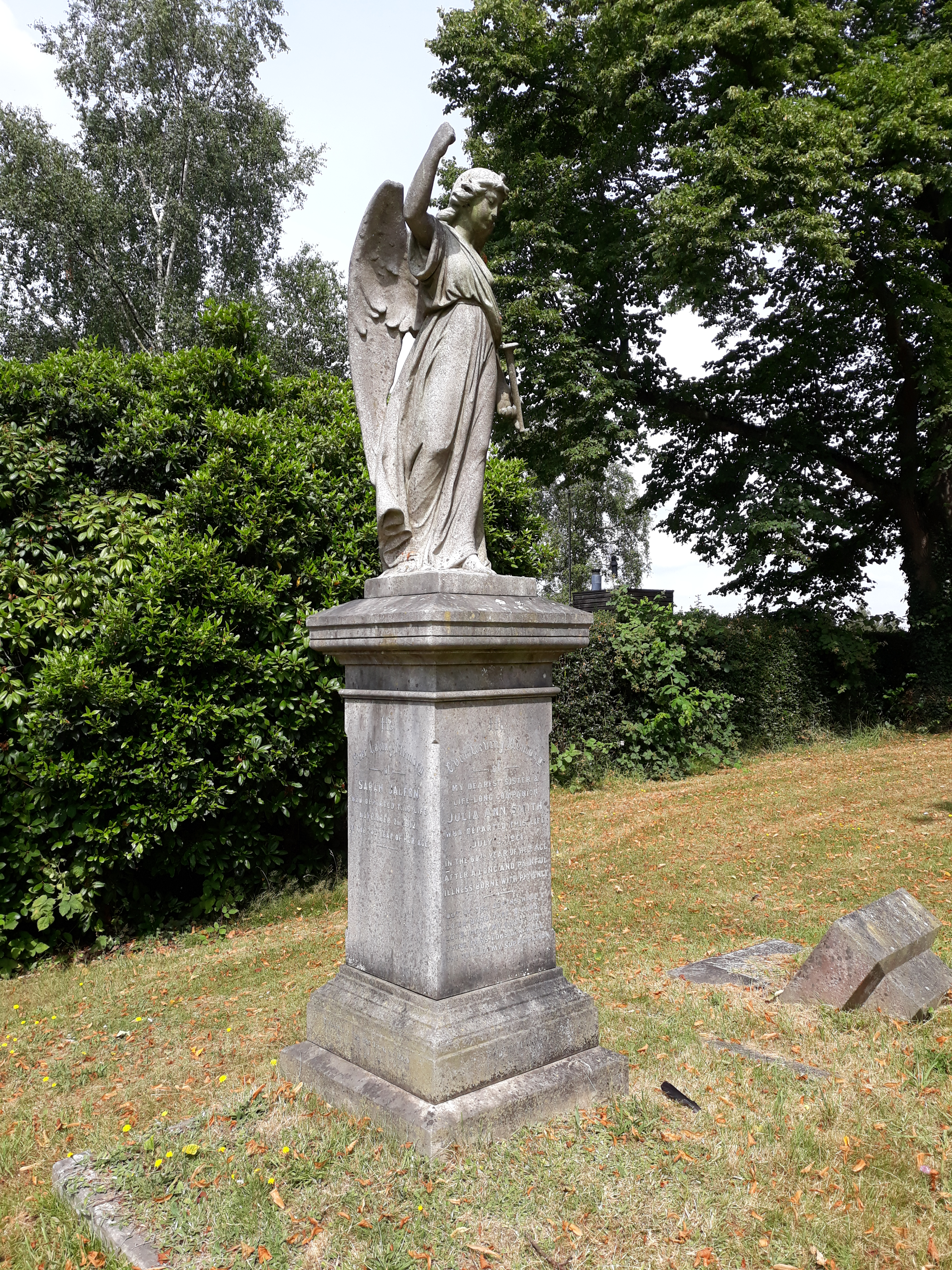
An elaborate monument in Ash Cemetery

At a meeting of Ash Vestry held in January 1886 at St Peter's Church in Ash it was decided to look at the possibility of purchasing land near the church as a burial ground for the expanding village. At a further meeting of the Vestry on 29 October 1886 at St Peter's a resolution was passed appointing a Burial Board which was to be composed of seven local residents:

The Reverend Albert Octavius Walsh, Rector of St Peter's church in Ash; the Reverend George Moss, Rector of Ash Vale; Lieutenant-Colonel John Bridges Walker of Ash Vale; factory manager James McLaren of Ash Vale; retired grocer John Woollard of Ash Vale; Major-General Frederick Hammersley of Ashe Grange, Ash; and local farmer William Bateman of Manor Farm in Ash.

The first meeting of the Board took place shortly after on 19 November 1886 in the School Room at Ash when the Reverend Walsh was elected Chairman. One acre 2 rods and 4 perches (now sections A to F of the cemetery) for the cemetery were bought in 1887 from the landowner, Winchester College, for £152 10s. This land was then cleared and trees planted and footpaths and fencing laid. The cemetery opened in July 1888 with the first funeral said to have been that of an unknown man who was found dead in the road outside the cemetery. The building of a cemetery chapel in 1889 cost £540 which was financed by a loan from an insurance company. The stained glass window memorial in the chapel to the Great War was the gift of local benefactor Henry Morris Chester of Poyle Park. George Manfield (1846–1908), a local farmer and the sexton of nearby St Peter's church was the cemetery's first gravedigger and cemetery caretaker at a salary of £10 yearly, increased in 1903 to £15. Manfield also had the responsibility for collecting the cemetery fees and paying them to the Parish Clerk.

While today the entire cemetery is consecrated for Christian burial it is claimed locally that in the cemetery's early years there was an unconsecrated section for "suicides, turks and infidels". However, no mention of this can be found in the Minutes of the Burial Board. Whenever an inmate of the local workhouse died other inmates would act as pallbearers at the pauper's funeral.

A further 4 acres 2 rods and 19 perches were purchased from Mr Hogsflesh in 1913 for £225.

== Use today ==
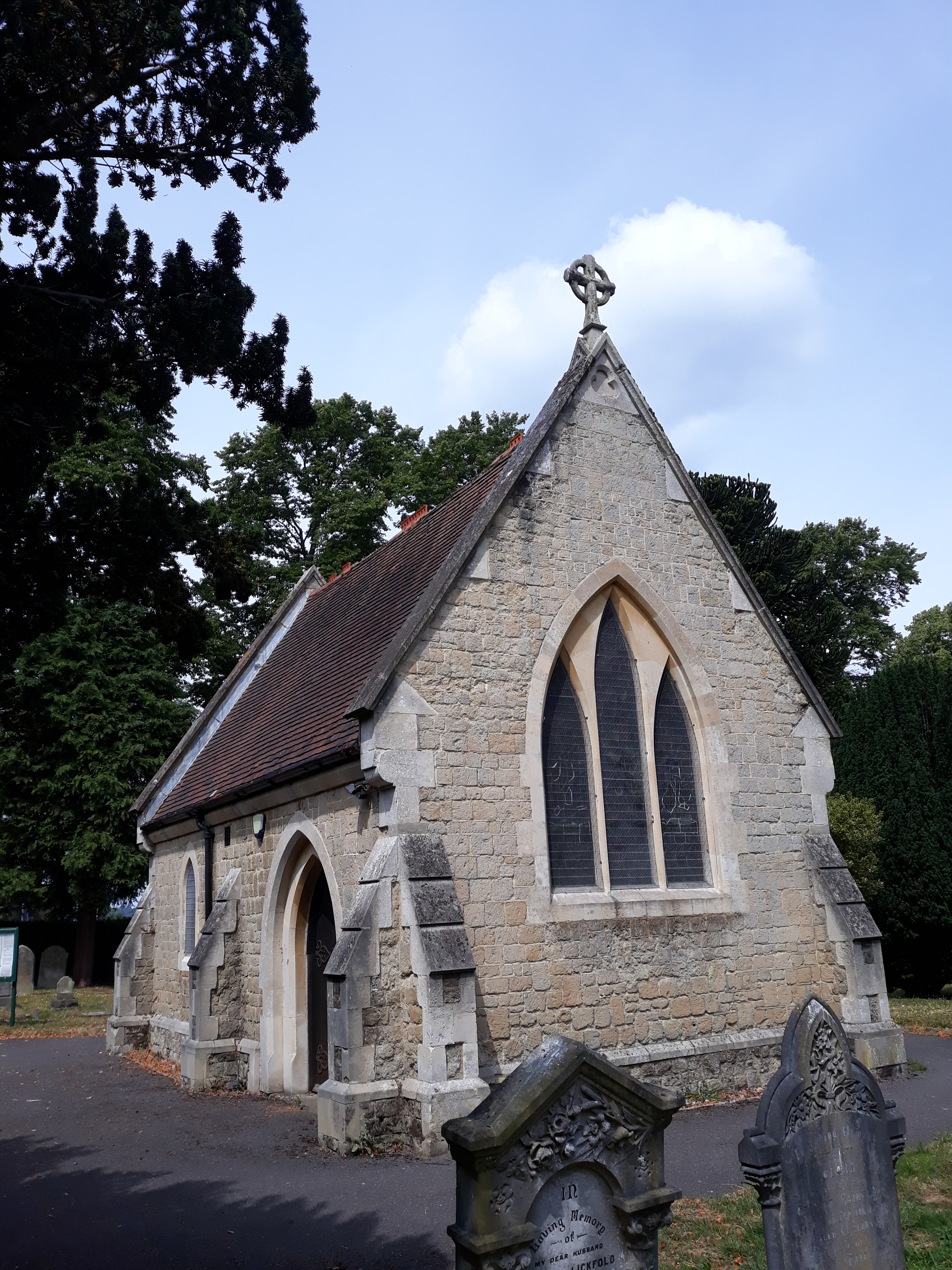
The cemetery chapel, now Ash Museum

There are 20 burials with the distinctive Commonwealth War Graves Commission (CWGC) headstones, with eleven burials of casualties from World War I and nine from World War II, including two members of Royal Air Force aircrew: Flight Sergeant George William Voice BEM (1906–1945), and Flight Lieutenant Alfred Alexander (1914–1940) who died of his injuries following an accident while flying an Airspeed Oxford.

Today, the cemetery covers eight acres while part of the cemetery chapel now houses Ash Museum. The cemetery has had more than 3,000 burials.
