= ASPT =

ASPT can refer to:

- Army School of Physical Training
- American Society of Plant Taxonomists
- Advanced sleep-phase type of circadian rhythm sleep disorder; see Advanced sleep phase disorder
