= Ash, Surrey =

Village and civil parish in Surrey, England

Coordinates: 51°14′55″N 0°43′29″W

Ash
- Village and civil parish
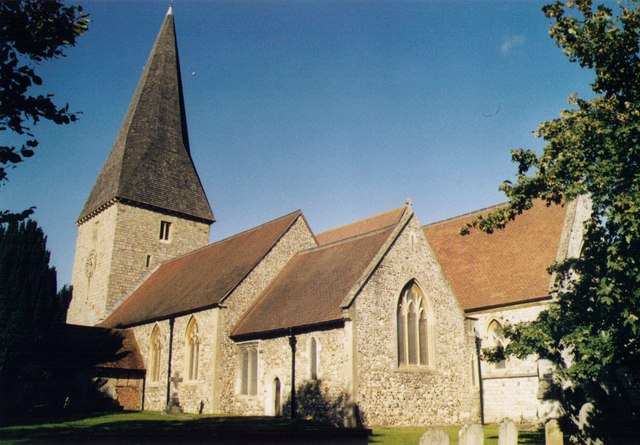
- St Peter's Church

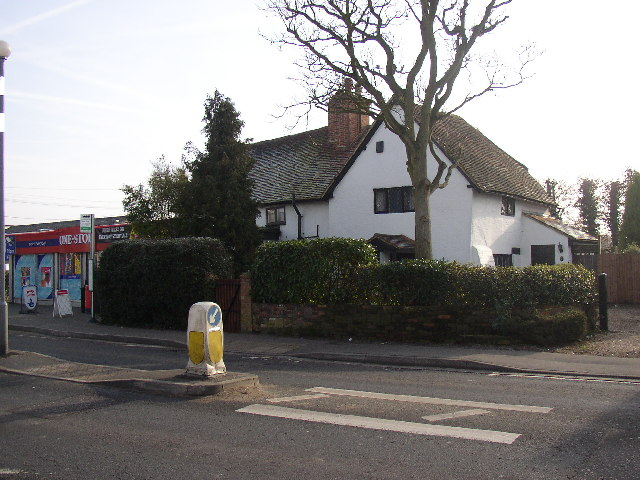
- Ash Post Office

- Location within Surrey
- Area: 9.74 km^{2} (3.76 sq mi)
- Population: 18,104 (Civil Parish including Ash Vale)
  - Density: 1,859/km^{2} (4,810/sq mi)
- OS grid reference: SU893516
- District: Guildford
- Shire county: Surrey
- Region: South East
- Country: England
- Sovereign state: United Kingdom
- Post town: Aldershot
- Postcode district: GU12
- Dialling code: 01252
- Police: Surrey
- Fire: Surrey
- Ambulance: South East Coast
- UK Parliament: Godalming and Ash

Ash is a village and civil parish in the far west of the borough of Guildford, Surrey. Ash is on the eastern side of the River Blackwater, with a station on the Reading-Guildford-Gatwick line, and direct roads to Aldershot, Farnham and Guildford. The 2011 census counted the residents of the main ward of Ash, which excludes Ash Vale, as 6,120. (Note: Based on the main area of Ash Wharf (one of the wards of the United Kingdom) covering 3.22 km^{2} whereas the Civil Parish had in 2011 a population of 17,549.) Ash has a small museum in the local cemetery chapel, a large secondary school and a library.

== Localities ==
The southern part of the parish, including St. Peter's Church and Ash village, is on the London Clay; but the greater portion, once including Frimley, covers the western side of the ridge of Bagshot Sands, which is divided from Chobham Ridges by the dip through which the Basingstoke Canal and railway run, and is known as Ash Common, Fox Hills and Claygate Common (now in Surrey Wildlife Trust and MoD use). (Note: Claygate Common in Ash is not to be confused with Claygate in the KT10 Esher postcode, Surrey)

=== Ash Green ===
Ash Green is the community closer to the Hog's Back, along which the east–west A31 runs, and has Whitegate Copse and arable fields as a green buffer on all sides.

The hamlet used to be served by Ash Green Halt. The railway station had two platforms and was situated on the Tongham branch of the Alton line before passenger services were withdrawn in 1937 along with Tongham station and ultimately the branch closed in 1960. Though the tracks have been long removed, the stretch of land from Tongham through Christmas Pie, where the route of the branch line still exists, is a popular attraction for cyclists and walkers. Ash Green Halt's station building, complete with its Southern Railway-style sign, still stands and has been converted into a house.

== History ==
From the prehistoric period, a few neolithic implements have been found and these are now in the Surrey Archaeological Society's Museum at Guildford.

There is no mention of a mill under Henley in the Domesday Book, but it is certain that a mill existed at Ash from comparatively early times, for in 1322 the Abbot of Chertsey ordered a new windmill to be built at Ash. Windmills were comparatively new in England then, and it may have been in place of a small water-mill of earlier date. There seems to be no later record of it.

The two manors existed. Ash (Esche, 7th century; Asshe, Assche, 14th century) shares with the other a prominent social history starting with at least the Norman period of the Domesday Book whose commissioners wrote "Azor granted [part of Henley known as Ash] for his soul to Chertsey in the time of King William. Later a 1279 chartulary of Chertsey Abbey records the prohibition of any perpetual title of institutions (as the Abbey states, vulgarly called the prohibition of mortmain) as led here to 11 acres in Ash with sufficient common pasture for his flocks and herds being held by Robert de Zathe, while Geoffrey de Bacsete (Bagshot) and his brother William had 28 acres. The Atwaters of West Clandon also held land in Ash. Nonetheless, from the church's freehold, overall control passed from 1537 in the Dissolution of the Monasteries to Winchester College. Henley, also seen as Henle, (14th century) and Suth henle and Henle on the Heth usually to distinguish Henley on Thames has hosted a long list of prominent figures. The de Henley, de Molyns (Note: whose right unusually had included the right of erecting gallows on the soil of the manor, and of passing judgement on malefactors apprehended there; see also Chobham Common regarding highwaymen), the crown as owner from Edward I to Charles I, Arthur Squib whose daughter married its next owner John Glynne, occupied briefly by the Duke of Roxburgh then via Glynne's granddaughter's husband, Sir Richard Child, created Earl of Tylney it then passed to ambassador and diplomat Solomon Dayrolles, upon whose death John Halsey bought it, whose family owned it from the 18th to 20th centuries.

The church is dedicated to St Peter, which distinguishes it from the other English places named Ash; Ash, in Kent, near Dartford, has a church to St Peter and St Paul.

Declared a parish, under Gilbert's Act, Ash was partly in the hundred of Godley and partly in Woking Hundred. It included in 1848 Frimley (a chapelry) and Normandy tything so altogether at that time had 2,236 inhabitants. The parish was and is intersected by the Basingstoke Canal and a branch of the South West Main Line and comprised, with Normandy in, about 4,000 acres (1,600 ha), of which 2,041 acres (826 ha) were common or waste, see geology under Surrey, i.e. wet lowland heath; (and including Frimley, about 10,015 acres). The soil of Ash yielded sandstone, dug from its common, used for building for centuries; and:

[Locally] pebbles are found, susceptible of a bright polish, which are commonly called Bagshot diamonds. The village is long and scattered, and situated in a dreary part of the country: south-eastward of it is Henley Park, which, being on an eminence, forms a beautiful contrast with the wild heath around. The living is a rectory, valued in the king's books [for land tax liability] at £15. 18. 11½.; net income, £473; patrons, the Warden and Fellows of Winchester College. The church [before] the dissolution of monasteries, was attached to the abbey of Chertsey... Dr. Young is said to have written a portion of the Night-Thoughts at the rectory-house, then the residence of Dr. Harris, who married a sister of the poet, and was incumbent from 1718 to 1759.

Young's poem is particularly noted for original adages such as "procrastination is the thief of time". Wyke near Worplesdon was added to the parish in 1880, however has changed parish council to that of Normandy.

=== Significant homes and listed buildings ===
In 1911 Henley Park, and two houses in Normandy were recorded as significant historic homes.

Henley Park estate can be traced back to the Domesday Book, when it was held by Azor, one of the guards of Edward the Confessor. The land was later owned by Chertsey Abbey, who leased it to the de Henley family. The estate passed through many hands, including the English Civil War rebel, John Glynne MP. Later tenants included Lord Pirbright, who entertained King Edward VII, and Sir Owen and Lady Roberts. During World War I, the house was used as an auxiliary hospital, and in the mid 20th century the estate was developed as a factory. It has since been restored to residential use.

The following listed buildings can be found in the village:

- St Peter's Church – Grade II*
- Azor Place – Grade II
- Tudor House – Grade II
- Ashe Grange – Grade II
- Oast house, Stable, Barn south of Ash Manor House – Grade II
- York House – Grade II
- Hartshorn – Grade II
- 92 Ash Street – Grade II
- Ashmead House – Grade II
- Merryworth – Grade II
- Ash Manor / Old Manor Cottage – Grade II
- The Post Office – Grade II
- Memorial Chapel - Grade II

== Education ==
In education, Ash has:

- Ash Grange School
- Walsh (C of E) School
- Shawfield School
- Ash Manor School which is county supported and has 937 students aged 11–16.

A museum occupies much of the large cemetery chapel. There is a Surrey County Council library in the village with a helpdesk to assist also with the most common Guildford borough council services.

=== Youth outreach ===
The Normandy Youth Club sponsors community-based programs targeting youth in the area for the purpose of increasing exposure to educational opportunities and building community cohesion. Since the closure of 2nd Ash Scout Group in 2010, 1st Ash Vale is the only local Scout group in Ash (for Beavers, Cubs and Scouts), and the Local Explorer Scout group is Hybrid Explorer Scouts.

== Sport and leisure ==
Ash United is the local football club, which currently plays in the Combined Counties League Division 1. The club is on Youngs Drive, opposite Shawfield Park.

== Transport ==
There is a frequent bus service through Ash, The 20, linking Ash to Guildford and Aldershot. There are other, less frequent, bus services connecting to Farnborough, and Camberley. The parish is also served by Ash Vale station with a direct London Waterloo service and the Guildford to Ascot line along with Ash and North Camp stations, both located within the parish, with direct services to Reading, Guildford, Redhill and Gatwick. The Basingstoke Canal passes through the north of the village.

== Famous residents ==
- of Ashe Grange:
  - Frederick Hammersley, owner
- of Henley Park (house):
  - John Glynne, owner
  - Solomon Dayrolles, diplomat, owner
  - Henry de Worms, 1st Lord Pirbright, Under-Secretary of State for the Colonies, tenant
  - Sir Owen Roberts, pioneer of technical education, tenant
- James Wade, darts player and 10x PDC major winner
- Andy Lane, author of Doctor Who and Young Sherlock Holmes novels lived in Ash for 11 years

== Demography and housing ==
The proportion of households in Ash Wharf, the central ward, who owned their home outright was 1.3% above the regional average. The proportion who owned their home with a loan was 3.7% above the regional average; providing overall a marginally lower proportion than average of rented residential property relative to that in Surrey, the district and the national average.

2011 Census Key Statistics
| Output area | Population | Households | % Owned outright | % Owned with a loan | hectares |
|---|---|---|---|---|---|
| Ash Wharf (ward) | 6,120 | 2,578 | 33.8 | 38.8 | 322 |

2011 Census Homes
| Output area | Detached | Semi-detached | Terraced | Flats and apartments | Caravans/temporary/mobile homes | Shared between households |
|---|---|---|---|---|---|---|
| (Civil Parish) | 2,090 | 2,619 | 1,536 | 1,027 | 56 | 2 |

The average level of accommodation in the region composed of detached houses was 28%, the average that was apartments was 22.6%.

In terms of ethnicity, Ash is relatively homogeneous. 94.8% of residents identified as white at the 2011 Census, higher than the overall figures for the Guildford district (90.9%), Surrey (90.4%), or the UK as a whole (87.2%). However, there is a significant Traveller community in the parish, who live both on specialist sites as well as in local housing estates. Some local schools employ specialist staff to improve cohesion with this group.

== Politics ==
As of 2024, Ash is in Godalming and Ash parliamentary constituency. Local government is administered by Guildford Borough Council and Surrey County Council.

At Surrey County Council, one of the 81 representatives represents the area within the Ash division.

At Guildford Borough Council three wards are deemed appropriate, represented under the current constitution by two to three councillors.

Guildford Borough Councillors
| Election | Member | Ward |
|---|---|---|
| 2019 | Paul Abbey | Ash South and Tongham |
| 2019 | Graham Eyre | Ash South and Tongham |
| 2013 | Paul Spooner | Ash South and Tongham |
| 2001 | Nigel Manning | Ash Vale |
| 1999 | Marsha Moseley | Ash Vale |
| 2015 | Andrew Gomm | Ash Wharf |
| 2015 | Jo Randall | Ash Wharf |

Surrey County Councillor
| Election | Member | Electoral Division |
|---|---|---|
| 2021 | Carla Morson | Ash |

== See also ==
- Ash Cemetery
- List of places of worship in the Borough of Guildford

== Notes and references ==
notes

references

- Jenkinson, S. (1990). Ash and Ash Vale – A Pictorial History, Chichester: Phillimore. ISBN 0-85033-773-9.
