= Ash Vale =

Village in Surrey, England

Coordinates: 51.27°N 0.72°W

- Village
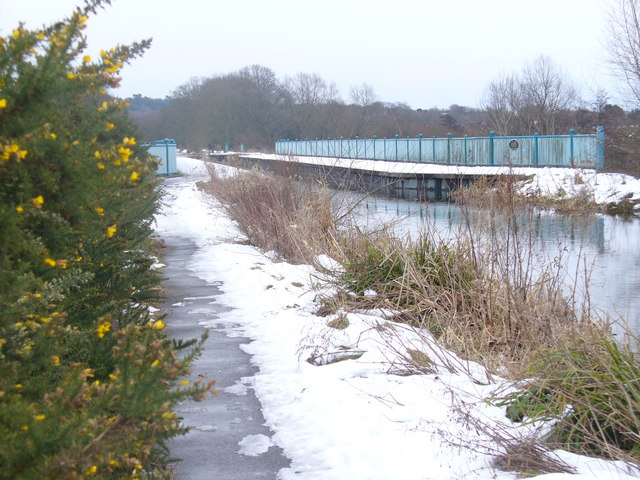
- The Basingstoke Canal aqueduct over the Blackwater has an adjoining footpath lined with mature gorse and heather, endemic to the south and east of the area

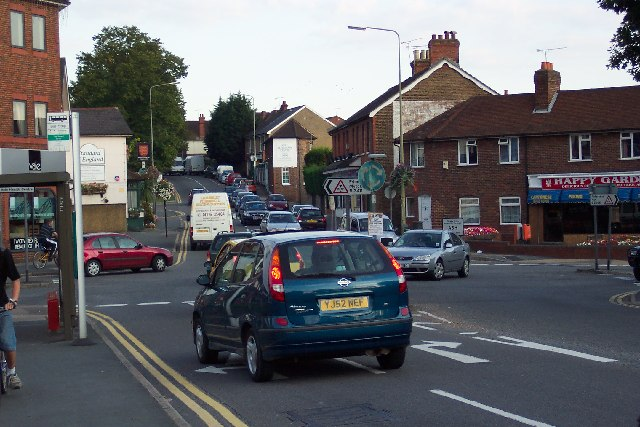
- Local shops at a busy crossroads, near Ash Wharf on the canal. The village is part of the technology-focussed Blackwater Valley Conurbation.

- Location within Surrey
- Area: 3.62 km^{2} (1.40 sq mi)
- Population: 5,686 (2011 census)
  - Density: 1,571/km^{2} (4,070/sq mi)
- OS grid reference: SU891524
- Civil parish: Ash
- District: Guildford
- Shire county: Surrey
- Region: South East
- Country: England
- Sovereign state: United Kingdom
- Post town: Aldershot
- Postcode district: GU12
- Dialling code: 01252
- Police: Surrey
- Fire: Surrey
- Ambulance: South East Coast
- UK Parliament: Godalming and Ash

Ash Vale is a village in the borough of Guildford in Surrey, England and the larger, northern settlement of the civil parish of Ash. It is 7 miles (11 km) from Guildford but is closer to the Hampshire towns of Aldershot and Farnborough, the centres of which are each about two miles (4 km) away, immediately across the two crossings of the River Blackwater, to the southwest and northwest.

== Geography ==
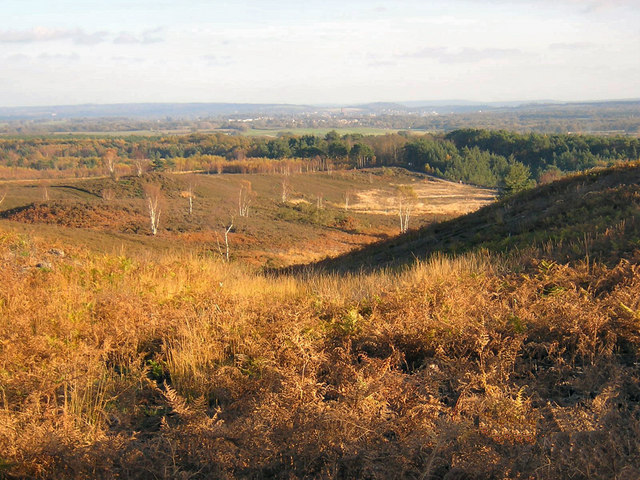
Military ranges at Ricochet hill

Ash Vale's extent is on two sides clearly demarcated, by the river to the west and at a few locks' higher elevation by the parallel Basingstoke Canal to the east – across these boundaries are, respectively, Aldershot Garrison (Military Town) and the large Surrey Heath MoD, mostly UK Army, ranges and training areas. The latter is a co-managed County Wildlife Site, for instance Ash Ranges at 2,439 acres (987 ha) and Pirbright Ranges at 2,765 acres (1,119 ha), with access days to various areas. The type of soil of the east, the heath is very acidic, sandy and loamy which makes up just 1.9% of English soil and 0.2% of Welsh soil, which gives rise to pines and coniferous landscapes, such as pioneered at Wentworth and Foxhills estate and is good for biodiversity. Ricochet Hill in the Ash Ranges is mostly covered with heather, fern and gorse. The rolling plateau of 80–118 metres (262–387 ft) above sea level has spots with views west and east, including Central London

Two branch railway lines cross in the middle of the village without forming a junction. In the north of the village are Ash Vale railway station and North Camp railway station, on the London-Aldershot-Alton Line and the Reading-Guildford-Gatwick Line respectively. In addition, trains run through Ash Vale from Guildford to Ascot via Aldershot. The village owes its development to the garrison and to the railways.

=== Environment ===
Air pollution is very low, with no Air Quality Management Areas in this borough or that immediately adjoining, Rushmoor. Drainage is good, the whole area draining westward by the valley of the upper Blackwater. In eastern parts distant ordnance fire can be heard from Ash ranges and occasional light aircraft on various tracks over the village take off from Farnborough Airport approximately three miles west.

== History ==
See History of Ash, Surrey.

== Economy and amenities ==
Although Ash Vale was a small semi-military community of the post-war era, the village is now largely a commuter settlement, relying on the half-hourly 40-minute railway connection to Waterloo (there are also local services). While 417 employed residents worked at/from home in 2001, the remaining 1306 commuted, of whom 682 responded they commuted less than 5 kilometres (3.1 mi).

Holly Lodge (Primary) School is next to Carrington Park, which has playground facilities and a route between nearby North Camp Station and Mytchett lake and Basingstoke Canal Visitor Centre on the Basingstoke Canal. The canal's towpath runs through the village.

=== Parks and Nature reserves in Ash Vale ===
- Carrington Recreation Ground, off Lysons Avenue
- Snaky Lane Local Nature Reserve, off Stratford Road
- Avondale Park, Avondale
- Lakeside Park, Lakeside Road
- Park off Hawker Road, Old Farm Place Estate
- Park off Beaufort Road, Old Farm Place Estate
- Park off Old Farm Place, Old Farm Place Estate

South of the village are:

- Lakeside Park nature reserve
- Willow Park Fishery
- Ash Parish Allotments

== Youth outreach ==
The Normandy Youth Centre serves the area by sponsoring community-based programs targeting youth in the area for the purpose of increasing exposure to educational opportunities and building a stronger community.

== Notable residents ==
- Ethel Caterham, supercentenarian, Britain's oldest ever person, and the oldest person in the world as of 30 April 2025.
- Samuel Franklin Cody, the first man to achieve powered heavier-than-air flight in Britain. (Note: The house, "Valecroft", where he spent the last few years of his life, still stands and a blue plaque on its wall commemorates Cody.)
- Darren and Martin Bicknell, professional cricketers.

== See also ==
- List of places of worship in Guildford (borough)

== Notes and references ==
notes
