= Ash Manor School =

Ash Manor School, Surrey

Location
- Manor Road; Ash, Surrey, GU12 6QH; England
- Coordinates: 51°14′26″N 0°43′45″W

Information
- Type: Comprehensive school
- Motto: Aspire and Achieve
- Established: 1948
- Local authority: Surrey
- Department for Education URN: 125271 Tables
- Ofsted: Reports
- Headteacher: Agnes Bailey
- Staff: 70
- Gender: Coeducational
- Age: 11 to 16
- Enrolment: 7.2
- Houses: 5
- Colours: Navy Blue and Light Blue
- Website: www.ashmanorschool.com

Ash Manor School is a comprehensive, community secondary school located in Manor Road, Ash, Surrey, England. Opened as Yeoman's Bridge School in 1948. The school was formed after a merger between two schools in 1986: Yeomans Bridge and Robert Haining. There are approximately 1102 students.

== Standards ==
During the last full inspection carried out by Ofsted at the school in December 2012, the inspectors judged the school to be Good. This grade was upheld in an Ofsted short inspection in March 2017.

== House system ==
Ash Manor is divided into five Houses. Each are known for their strong individual characteristics and competitiveness in sport. While the House colours have remained unchanged, the names of Houses—Phoenix, Sparta, Galileo, and Venture—were originally named after the surnames of famous people from British History, they were: Brunel, Faraday, Wells and Newton. The current names were picked via democratic vote by the students within each house and are:

- Phoenix
- Sparta
- Galileo
- Venture
- Hypatia

Previously, Year 7 had their own house, called Darwin, but this has since been merged back into the other houses. The house colour was gold and pupils were given matching gold house ties.

== Former pupils ==
- Peter Storey, former Arsenal and England football player
- Stephanie Twell, middle-distance runner who competed in the 2008 Summer Olympics and 2020 Summer Olympics
- James Wade, champion darts player
