= Royal Army Physical Training Corps Museum =

Regimental Museum in Aldershot, Hampshire

Coordinates: 51°15′48″N 0°45′21″W

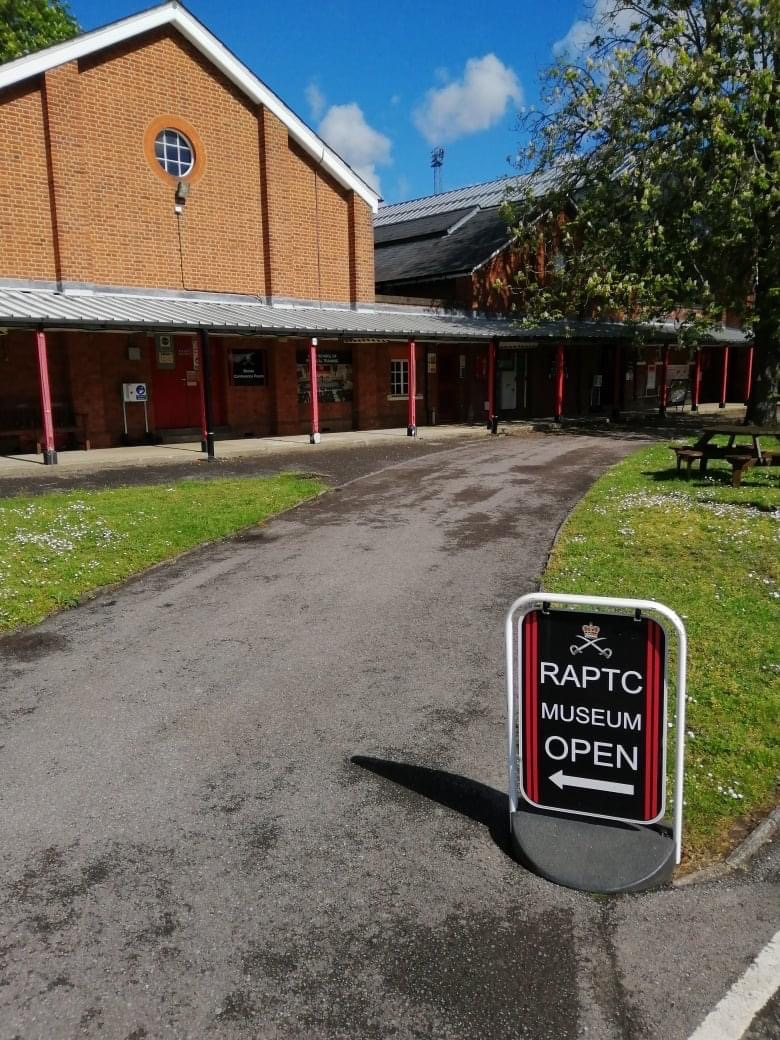
Entrance to the Royal Army Physical Training Corps Museum (2024)

The Royal Army Physical Training Corps Museum is the regimental museum for the Royal Army Physical Training Corps (RAPTC) which is based in Aldershot in Hampshire. The museum is located in the grounds of the Army School of Physical Training on Fox Lines in the Military Town, and tells the story of the RAPTC from its foundation in the 1860s to the present day.

The aim of the RAPTC Museum is to "educate the public and members of the Corps in the history and military accomplishments of the Corps and to promote military efficiency and encourage recruitment by public exhibit of the collection in a museum or museums or such other public places as the Trustees may from time to time decide, and to conserve, restore, repair, reconstruct and preserve objects in the collection.". The museum showcases historic and current day examples of the uniform, medals, weapons, sporting and Olympic memorabilia, personalities, trophies and training equipment used by the RAPTC. The displays show how physical training in the British Army has advanced from the first organised training sessions in the 1860s to modern concepts of fitness, health and exercise.

== History ==
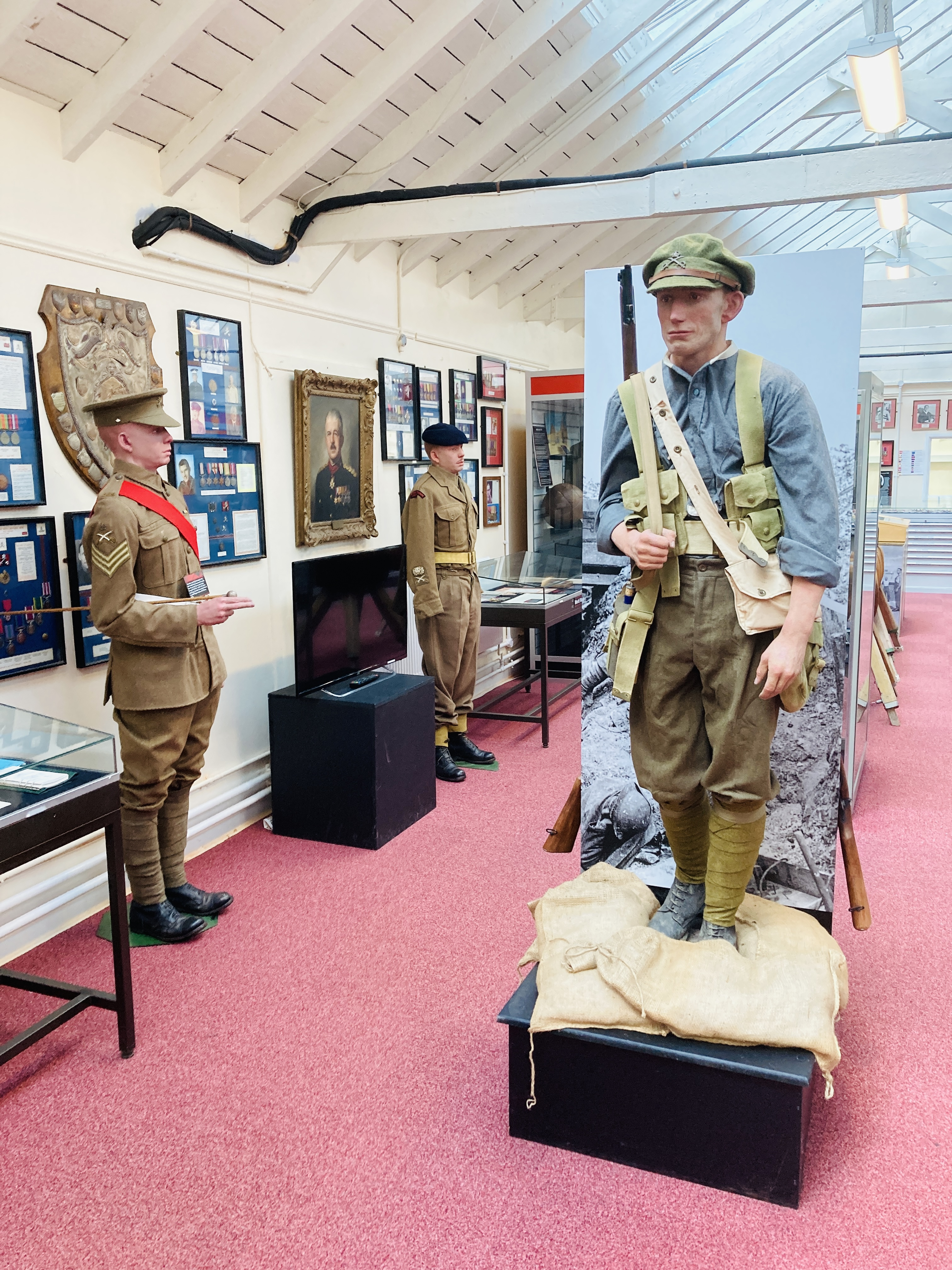
A display in the Royal Army Physical Training Corps Museum

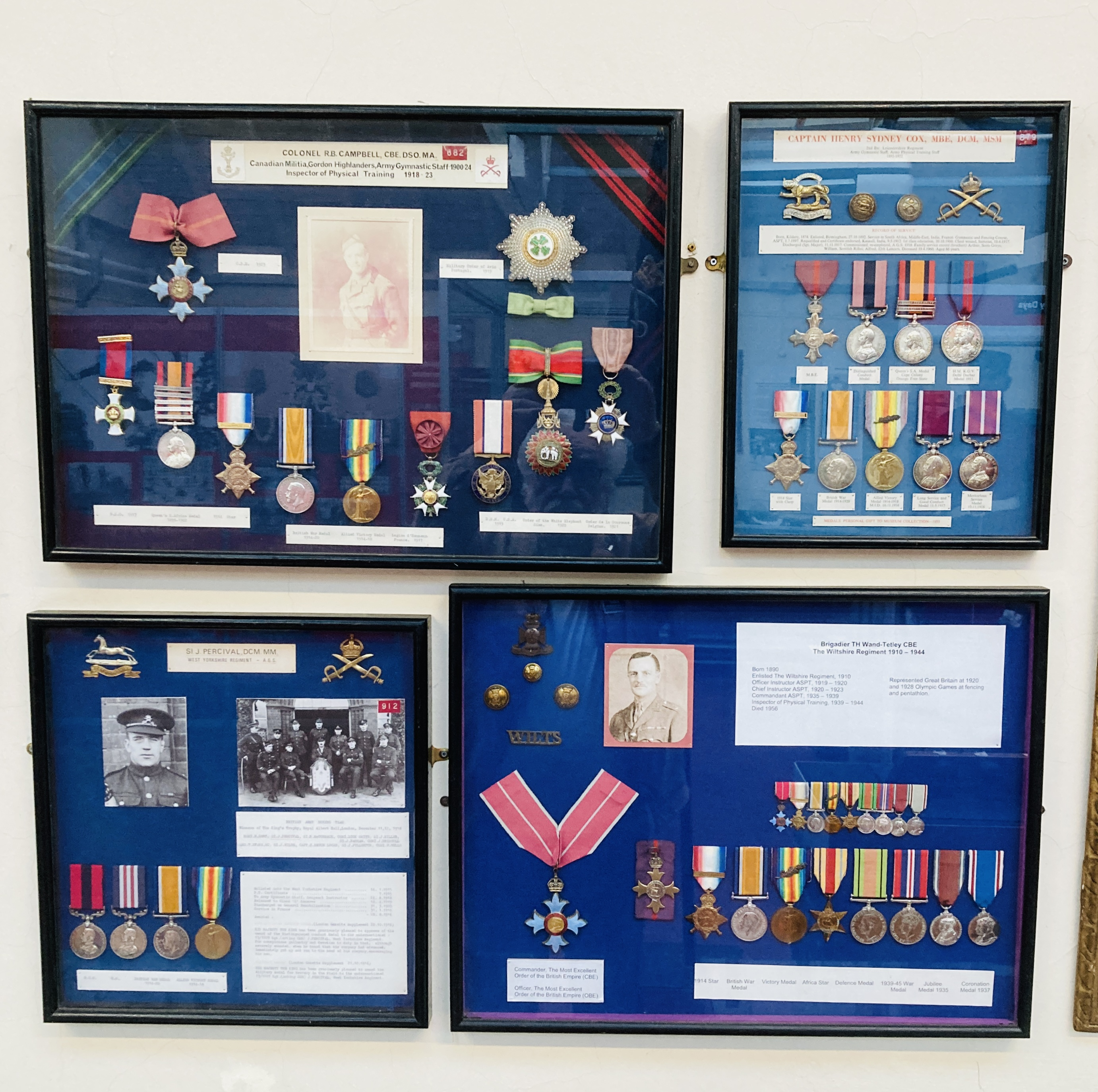
A display of medals in the Royal Army Physical Training Corps Museum

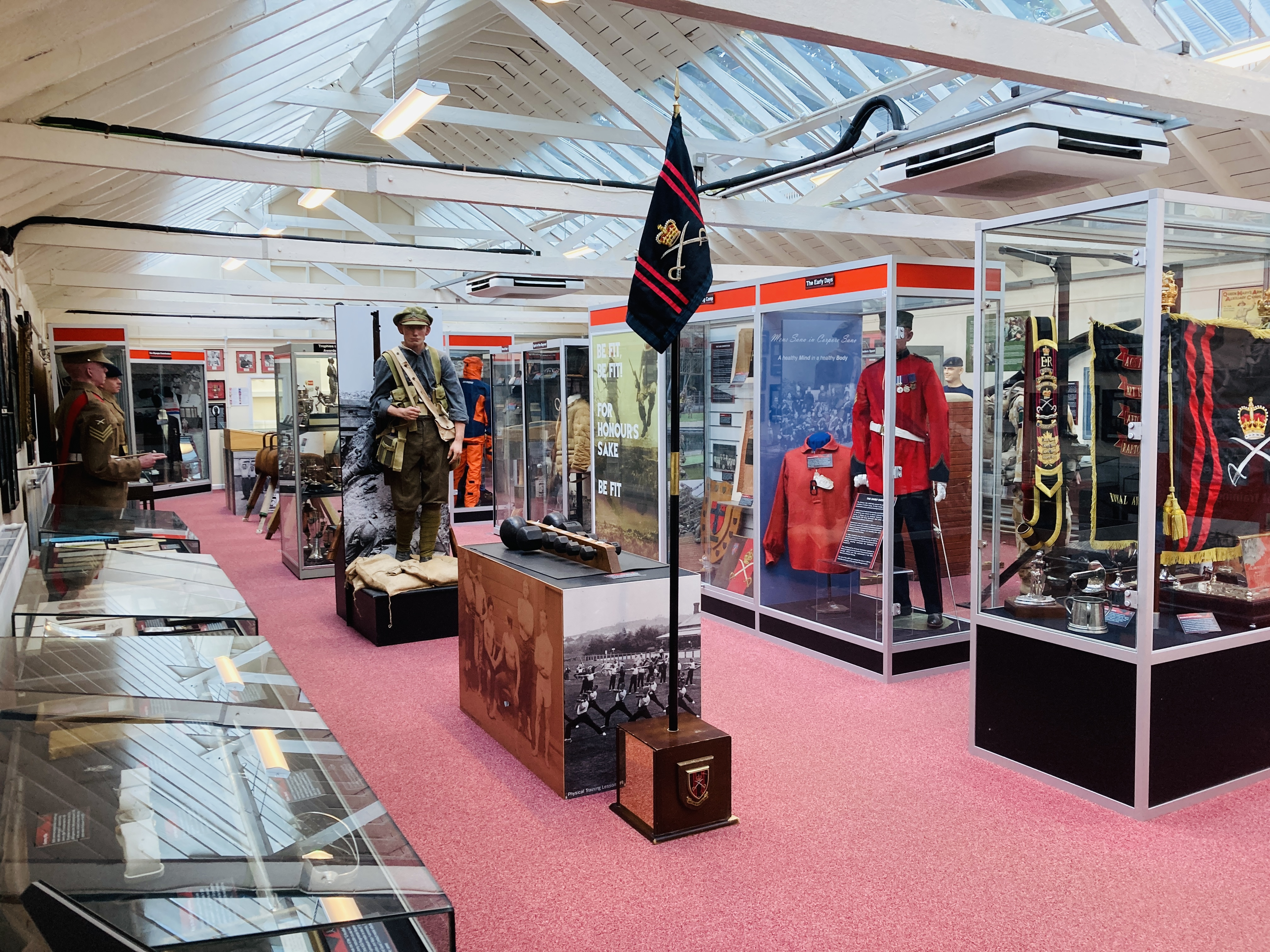
A view inside the museum

The RAPTC Museum was founded in 1953 to display the then nearly one century old work and achievements of the Royal Army Physical Training Corps. The Museum was in a variety of locations on the Army School of Physical Training site on Queens Avenue in Aldershot before moving to its latest premises in the former Henslow fencing room in 2012.

== The Galleries ==
Through interactive and static displays, the galleries show the history and development of fitness in the British Army from the 1860s to the present through medals, uniforms, artifacts and physical training equipment. Key and notable figures in the history of the RAPTC are shown, including Frederick Hammersley and the Twelve Apostles, Sir George Malcolm Fox, Audrey Williamson, Dame Kelly Holmes, etc.
