= Royal Army Physical Training Corps =

Physical training arm of the British Army

- Badge of the Royal Army Physical Training Corps
- Active: 1860–present
- Country: United Kingdom
- Branch: British Army
- HQ: Aldershot Garrison
- Motto: Mens sana in corpore sano (A healthy mind in a healthy body)
- March: Be Fit

Commanders
- Territorial commander: Major R.J. Morley

Insignia
- Tactical Recognition Flash

The Royal Army Physical Training Corps (RAPTC) is the British Army corps responsible for physical fitness and physical education and has been headquartered in Aldershot since its foundation in 1860. Its members are all Royal Army Physical Training Corps Instructors (RAPTCIs).

== History ==
During the Crimean War about 27,000 British troops died - most not as a result of wounds in battle but of disease. Investigations after the War concluded that so many had died because of their poor physical condition, resulting in their inability to fight off the effects of the diseases. In 1860 a number of military reforms began, including an investigation of methods of improving the physical fitness of soldiers in the Army. In 1859 the War Office sent Colonel Frederick William Hamilton and Dr. Thomas Galbraith Logan, the Inspector General of Hospitals, to France and Prussia to report on the physical training systems in the armies in those countries. Their report stated that the French army had had a gymnastic physical training regime since the 1840s, with a central gymnastics training school founded in 1852; while the Prussian army had introduced military gymnastics training in 1842. Hamilton firmly advised that the War Office should institute a similar system of gymnastics training for the British Army.

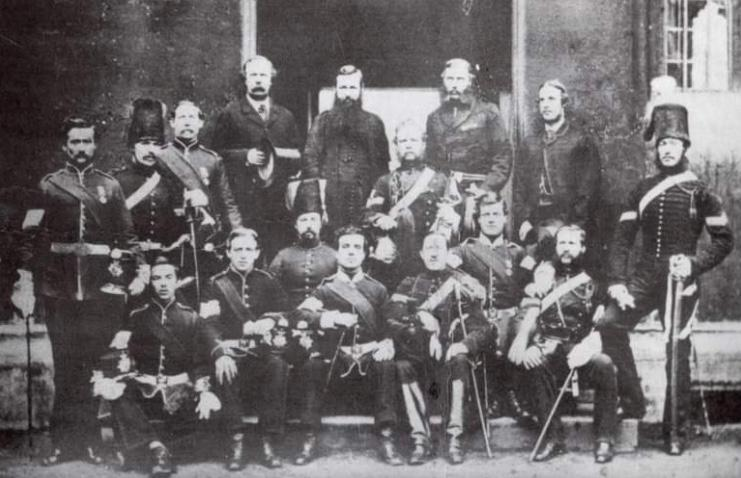
Archibald MacLaren (back row holding hat) and Captain Frederick Hammersley (in door, right) with the twelve NCO's and two of MacLaren's assistants at the Oxford Gymnasium (1860)

Major Frederick Hammersley and twelve carefully selected non-commissioned officers (NCOs) (who later became known as the Twelve Apostles) were put through a twelve month course of physical training in Oxford under the PT specialist and educator Archibald MacLaren (1820–1884) who had trained in Europe and who in 1858 had opened a renowned gymnasium at the University of Oxford where he taught fencing and gymnastics. MacLaren used the techniques he had developed in his gymnasium, charting the physical changes in the men with each of the NCO's being photographed before and after their training and regularly measured to check their development. On completing the course it was apparent that each man's physical fitness had considerably improved and they became the foundation of what was to be called the Army Gymnastic Staff (AGS). In 1861 a gymnasium was built at Aldershot based on MacLaren's Oxford Gymnasium.

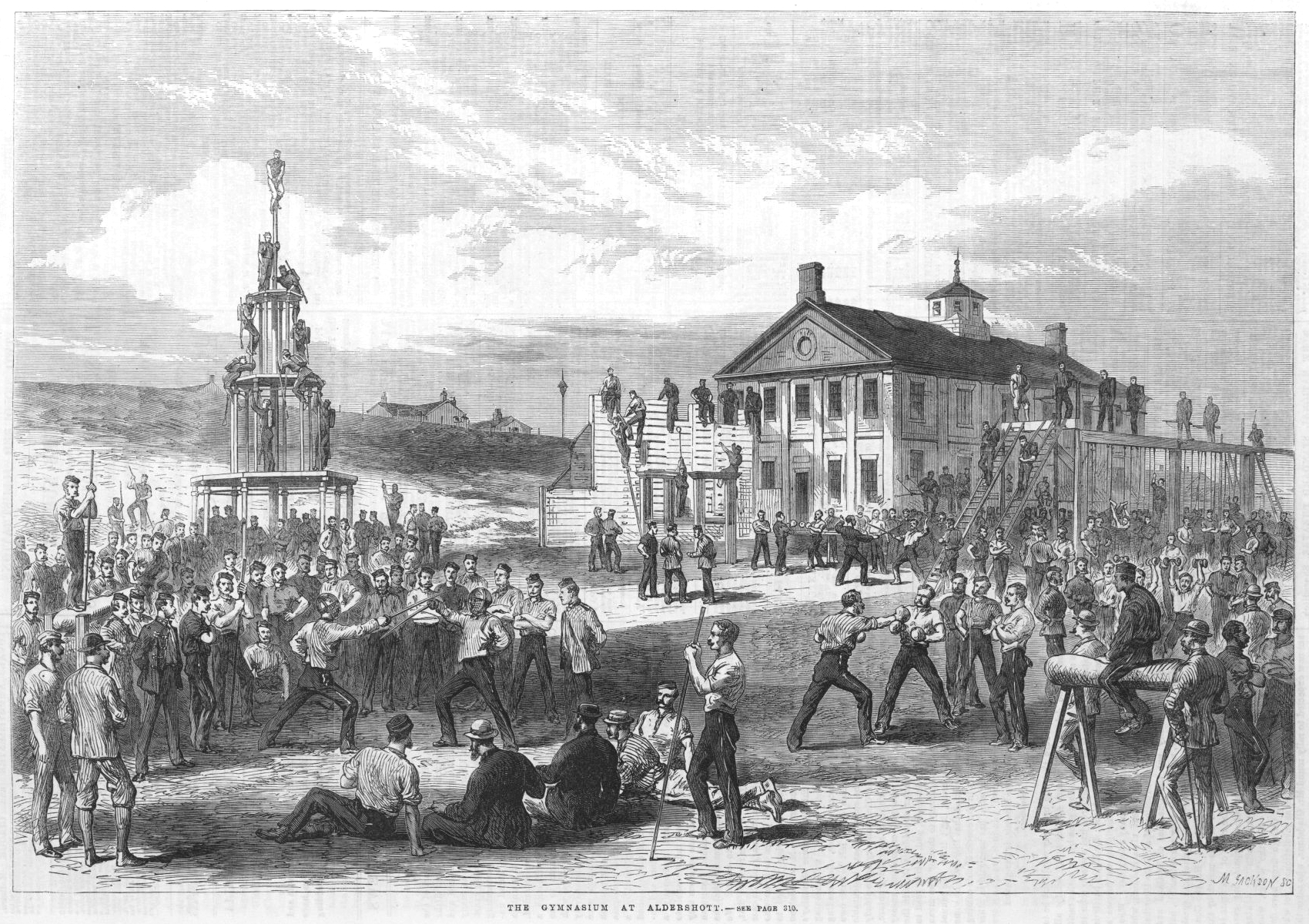
'The Gymnasium at Aldershott' - based on Archibald MacLaren's Oxford Gymnasium - The Illustrated London News (1868)

Members of the AGS were based at the newly built military gymnasiums where they trained soldiers in the new physical training techniques. Other members of the AGS joined Army units where they trained soldiers in fencing, gymnastics and other elements of physical training in addition to organising recreational sporting activities. As a result of the new exercise regime the sickness and mortality rates in the British Army decreased and the reforms were approved in the 1864 Report on Gymnastic Instruction in the Army.

The Army Gymnastic Staff was renamed the Army Physical Training Staff in 1918 and was given corps status as the Army Physical Training Corps by Army Order 165 in 1940.

Notable former Army Physical Training Instructors include Nik Stuart, a former National Gymnastic Coach, and Olympic medallists Kriss Akabusi and Kelly Holmes.

At the Festival of Remembrance on 13 November 2010, Huw Edwards announced that the Army Physical Training Corps had been granted the title Royal Army Physical Training Corps by Her Majesty the Queen. This became effective immediately.

== Characteristics ==
The corps cap badge, which is also worn on the front of its vests, t-shirts and tracksuits, consists of crossed swords surmounted by a crown. The corps motto is Mens sana in corpore sano which means 'a healthy mind in a healthy body'. Its quick march is Be Fit, with words taken from Land and Sea Tales by Rudyard Kipling.

It is not possible to join the RAPTC directly from civilian life. Prospective PTIs must first join another regiment or corps and then qualify as Regimental All Arms Physical Training Instructor (AAPTI) after an eight-week course at the ASPT (The Reserve version of the course is shorter and lasts just under 2 weeks). They then return to their own unit and only after further experience can they attend selection for the RAPTC. If they pass the selection course they follow a 30-week training course before qualifying as Advanced PTIs and transferring to the RAPTC as an RAPTCI.

== See also ==
- Royal Army Physical Training Corps Museum
- Fitness boot camp
- History of physical training and fitness
- Military sports

Preceded by Intelligence Corps	Order of Precedence	Succeeded by General Service Corps
