= Frederick Hammersley (British Army officer, born 1824) =

Major-general Frederick Hammersley
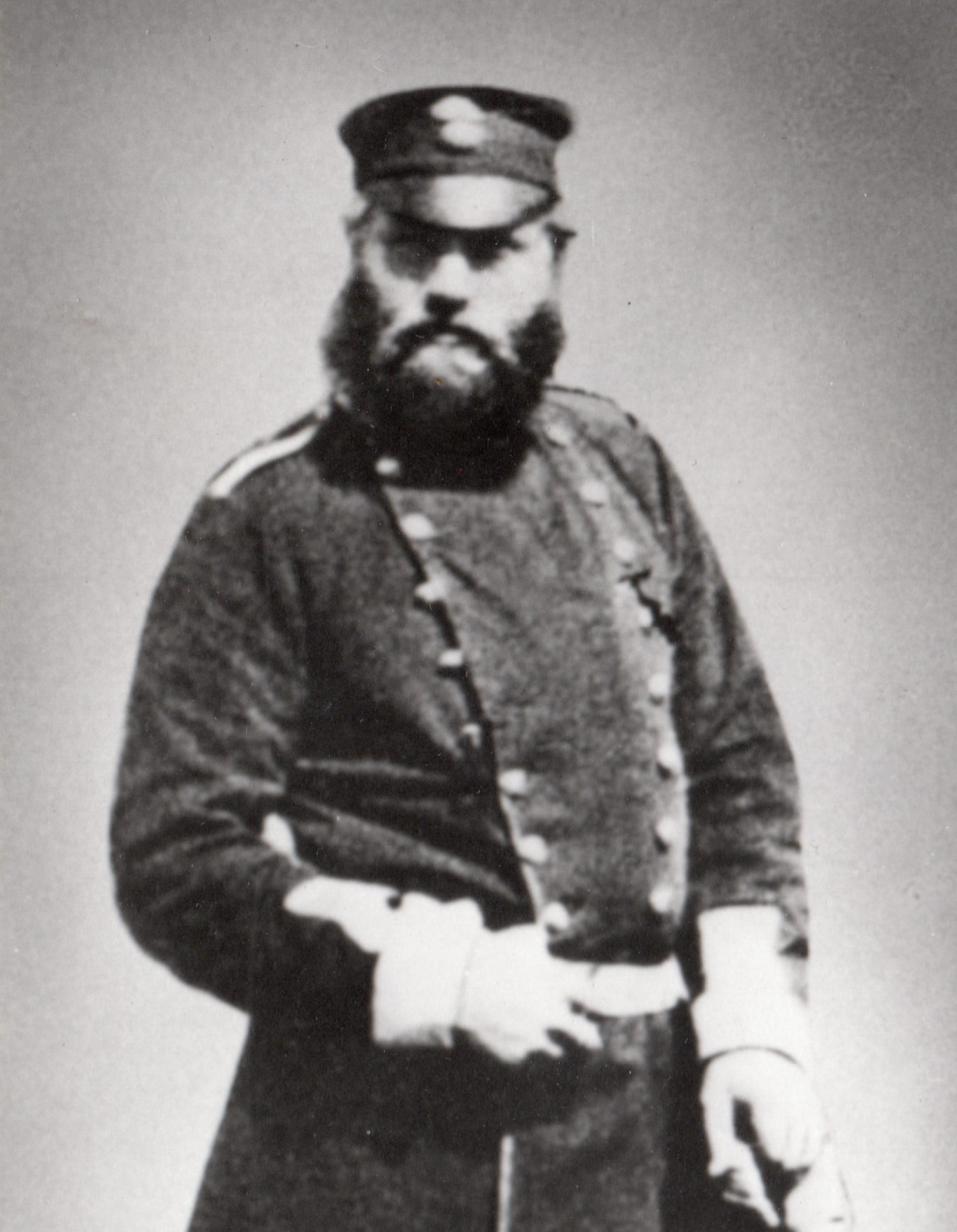
- Major Frederick Hammersley on service during the Crimean War with the regimental Grenadier company of the 14th Regiment of Foot, by Roger Fenton, 1855
- Born: 25 July 1824; Dulwich, Surrey, England
- Died: 22 December 1901 (aged 77)

Major-General Frederick Hammersley (25 July 1824 − 22 December 1901) was a British Army officer who after serving in the Crimean War was at the forefront in developing an exercise regime for the British Army leading to him becoming the first Inspector of Gymnasia and being known as ‘The Father of Army Gymnastics’.

== Early life ==
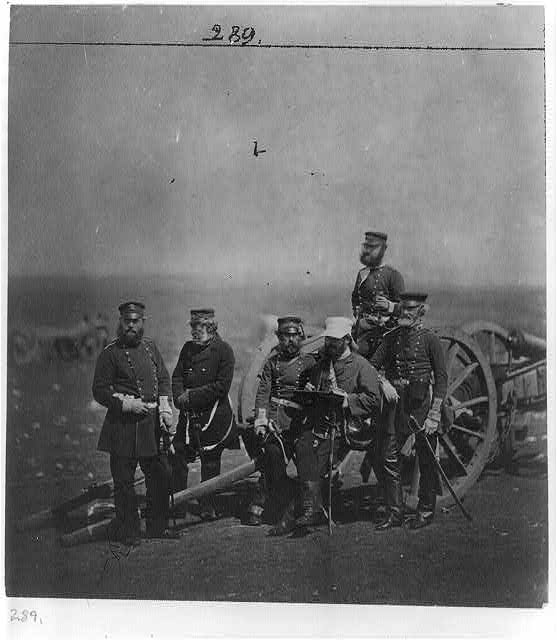
Captain Hammersley (left), with Major Ralph Budd, Captains John Dwyer, William Cosmo Trevor, John Barlow and Angus Hall of the 14th Regiment of Foot in the Crimea - Roger Fenton (1855)

He was born in Dulwich in Surrey in 1824, the son of Emily and Charles Hammersley. Hammersley joined the Army with a commission by purchase as an ensign in the 14th Regiment of Foot (West Yorkshire Regiment) in 1842, was promoted lieutenant in April 1846 and captain in April 1851. He served during the Siege of Sebastopol during the Crimean War with the rank of brevet major (June 1856) and deputy assistant quartermaster general.

== Inspector of Gymnasia ==
During the Crimean War about 27,000 British troops died - the majority not as a result of wounds in battle but of disease. Investigations after the War decided that so many had died owing to their poor physical condition, resulting in their inability to fight off the effects of the diseases. In 1860 a number of military reforms began as a result of the poor performance of the British Army during the Crimean War, and one of these reforms was to investigate methods of improving the physical fitness of soldiers in the Army. In 1860 Major Hammersley was appointed sergeant and instructor in physical training at Aldershot in Hampshire, where he became known as ‘the father of Army gymnastics’.

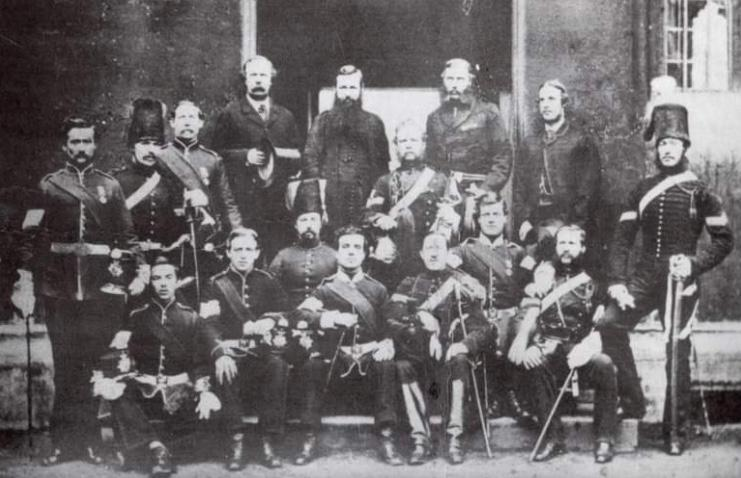
Archibald MacLaren (back row holding hat) and Captain Hammersley (in door, right) with the twelve NCO's and two of MacLaren's assistants at the Oxford Gymnasium (1860)

It was thought that the officer who would be in charge of overseeing the new fitness training should undergo the same training as his men. As a result, he and twelve carefully selected non-commissioned officers (NCOs), chosen for their unexceptional physical stature (who later became known as the Twelve Apostles), were put through a twelve month course of physical training at the University of Oxford under the PT specialist and educator Archibald MacLaren (1820–1884) who had trained in Europe and who in 1858 had opened a renowned gymnasium in Oxford where he taught fencing and gymnastics. On completing the course it was apparent that each man's physical fitness had considerably improved and they became the foundation of what was to be called the Army Gymnastic Staff (AGS). Today this is the Royal Army Physical Training Corps.

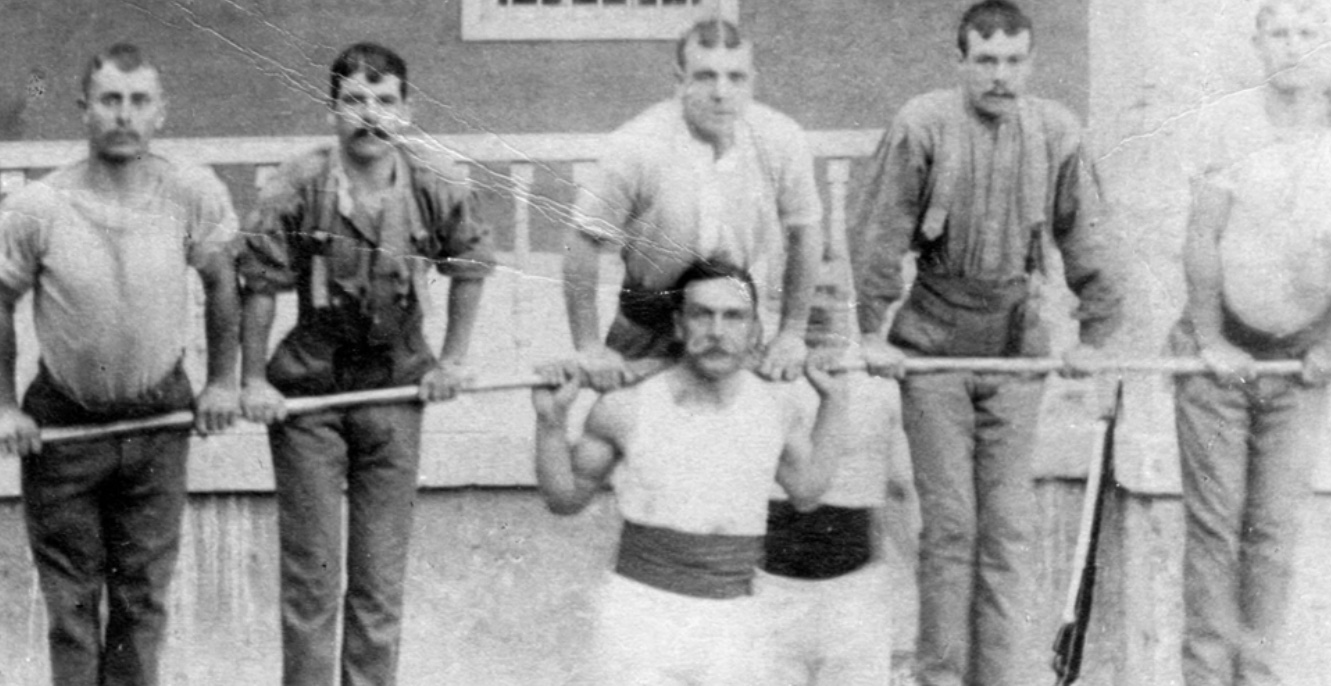
Hammersley lifting five men c1860

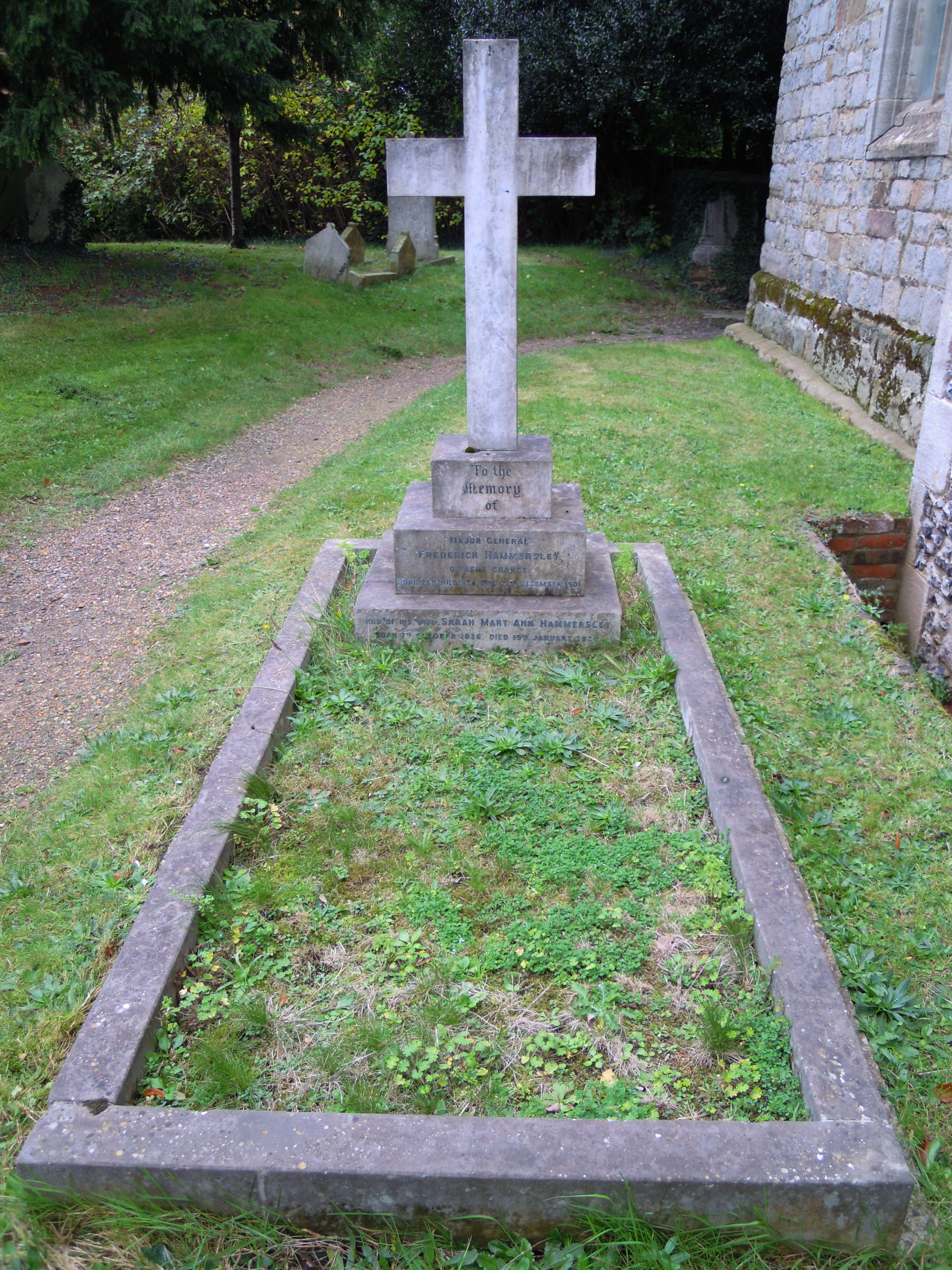
The grave of Major-general Frederick Hammersley in the churchyard of St Peter's church in Ash, Surrey

After completing the course of gymnastics at Oxford Hammersley was offered the recently created rank of Superintendent of Gymnasia, to be based at the newly established School of Gymnastics in the Wellington Lines at Aldershot. Before accepting the position Hammersley wrote to his father for advice, to which his father answered in the negative, advising his son that he should not be tempted by the offer of an "easy berth" in accepting a position "hardly fit for a gentleman, much less an officer, who aspires to military distinction." Hammersley, described as "a man of outstanding ability" and a "practical athlete with one of the finest physical developments I have ever seen" disregarded his father's advice and accepted the offer. Through his efforts and dedication to improving the physical fitness of the British soldier, gymnastics training in the Army was successfully established. In 1866 Hammersley became the first chairman of the Amateur Athletic Club, which in 1880 became the Amateur Athletic Association.

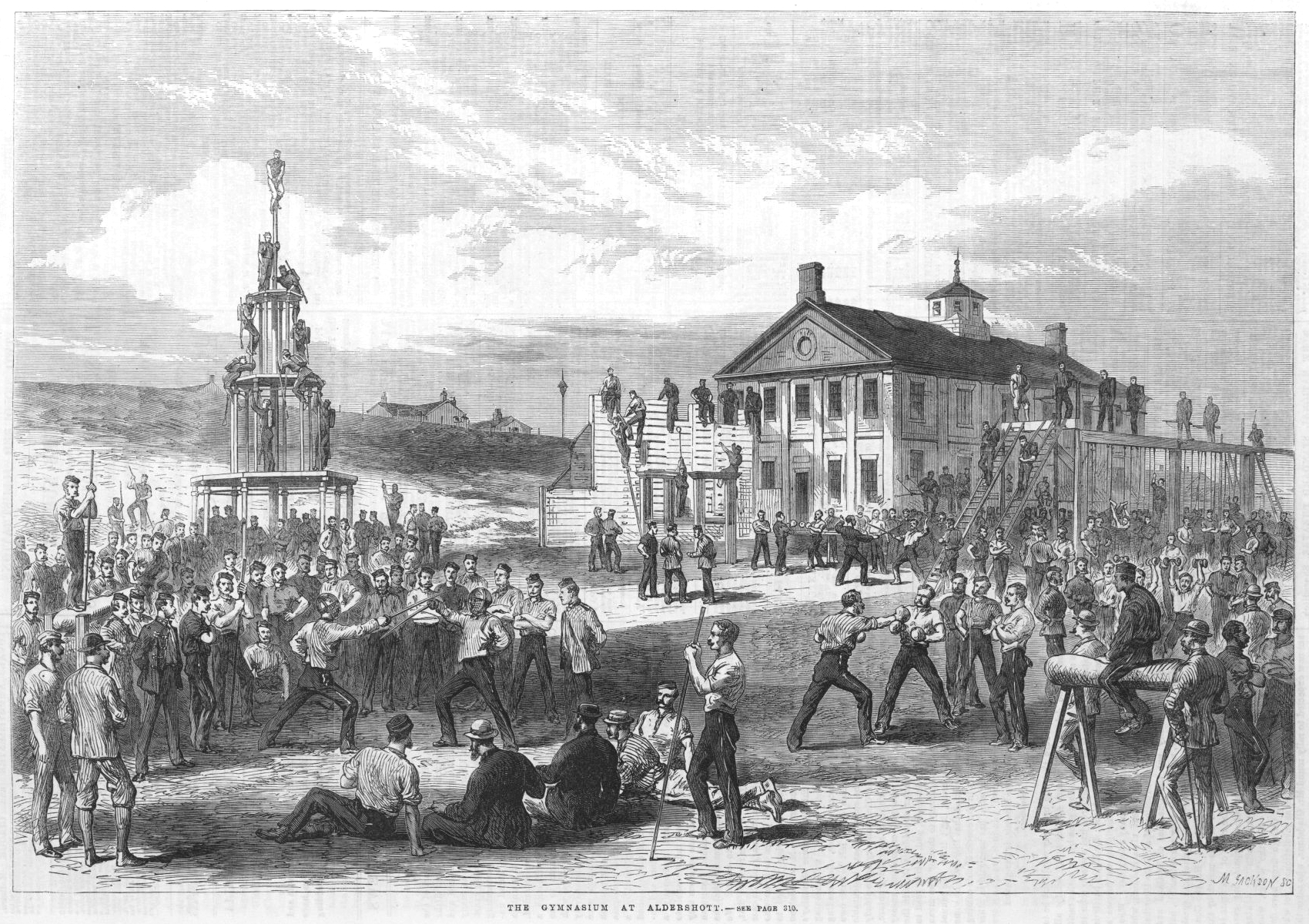
'The Gymnasium at Aldershott' - based on Archibald MacLaren's Oxford Gymnasium - The Illustrated London News (1868)

Members of the AGS were based at the newly built military gymnasiums (the first, the Cranbrook Gymnasium, was built at Aldershot in 1861) where they instructed soldiers in the new physical training techniques. Other members of the AGS joined Army units where they instructed soldiers in fencing, gymnastics and other elements of physical training in addition to organising recreational sporting activities. As a result of the new exercise regime the sickness and mortality rates in the British Army decreased and the reforms were approved in the 1864 Report on Gymnastic Instruction in the Army.

== Later life ==
Hammersley held the rank of inspector of military gymnasia at Aldershot from 1860 to 1876, and was promoted to lieutenant-colonel in January 1868 on half-pay, colonel and assistant quartermaster general at Aldershot in 1873, and retired on a pension in 1879 with the honorary rank of major-general. In 1876 he was succeeded as inspector of gymnasia by Lieutenant-colonel G. F. Gildea (1876-1880). A devout Christian, Hammersley worshipped at St Peter's Church in Ash where he regularly contributed to church funds and appeals. In 1886 he was appointed to the newly formed burial board for Ash Cemetery.

Major General Fred Hammersley died in December 1901 aged 77, leaving a widow, Sarah Mary Ann née Keating (1826–1922), two daughters, Mary Catherine Hammersley (c1857–1928) and Florence Hammersley (born 1863) and a son, Frederick Hammersley (1858–1924), who himself reached the rank of major-general. He lived at Ashe Grange in Ash in Surrey and his funeral took place at St Peter's Church in Ash on 27 December 1901. He is buried in the churchyard there. He left an estate valued at £31,398 17s.

Hammersley Barracks in Aldershot, Hampshire, were named in his memory.

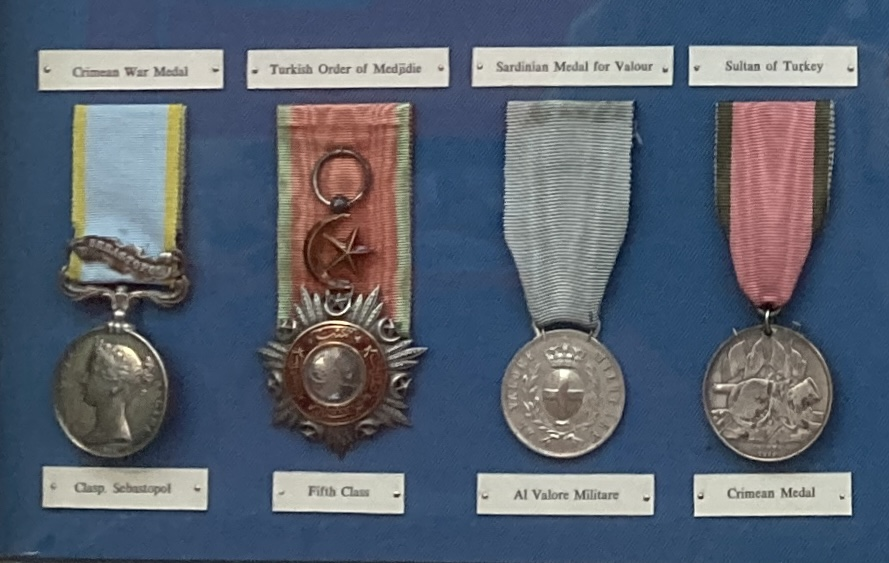
The medals of Frederick Hammersley displayed at the Royal Army Physical Training Corps Museum in Aldershot in Hampshire

== Medal entitlement ==
Frederick Hammersley was entitled to the following medals:

Ribbon	Description	Notes
	Crimea Medal	1855
	Order of the Medjidie	5th Class 1855
	Turkish Crimea Medal	1855
	Sardinian Crimea Medal	1855
