= Archibald MacLaren =

Scottish fencing master, gymnast, educator and author

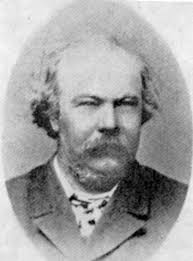
- Archibald MacLaren
- Born: January 29, 1820; Alloa, Clackmannanshire, Scotland
- Died: February 19, 1884 (aged 65); Oxford, England
- Occupations: Fencing master; author; educator; gymnast
- Known for: Founding the Oxford Gymnasium; Father of British Army physical training; A System of Physical Education
- Spouses: Charlotte Wheeler Talboys (m. 1844); Gertrude Frances Müller (m. 1851)
- Children: 3 (including Mabel MacLaren)

Archibald MacLaren (29 January 1820 – 19 February 1884) or Maclaren was a Scottish fencing master, gymnast, educator and author who in 1858 opened a well-equipped gymnasium at the University of Oxford where from 1860 to 1861 he trained 12 sergeants and their officer who then disseminated his training regimen into the newly formed Army Gymnastic Staff (AGS) for the British Army. The AGS was later to become the Royal Army Physical Training Corps. His training scheme was also later adopted by several British public schools including Rugby School in 1872 and universities. He wrote a number of books on physical training theory and practice.

== Early life ==
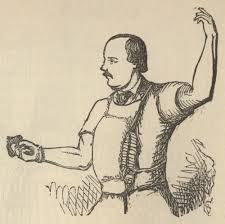
MacLaren depicted in the novel The Adventures of Mr. Verdant Green by Cuthbert M. Bede (1850s)

MacLaren was born in 1820 at Alloa, Clackmannanshire in Scotland, the son of Jean née Stewart (born 1769) and Archibald MacLaren (born 1771). Brought up as a Presbyterian, he was educated at Dollar Academy until aged about 16 when he travelled to Paris where he studied fencing, gymnastics and medicine. While in Paris he also developed an interest in physical training and on returning to Britain he was listed in about 1840 as a fencing master in Oxford where he equipped rooms to teach fencing and gymnastics.

In Oxford he married firstly Charlotte Wheeler Talboys (1825–1844), the daughter of David Alphonso Talboys (c1790–1840), the radical Oxford politician and printer and bookseller. She died in 1844 after having only been married for three months. In 1851 as a 'fencing master' he was living with his widowed mother-in-law and her family in Oxford, including her 18 year-old daughter Gertrude Later that year in London he quietly married 18 year-old Gertrude Isabel Frances Talboys (1833–1896), a classics scholar and teacher - and his late wife's younger sister. During this period it was illegal for a man to marry his deceased wife’s sister. The couple had three daughters and two sons: Gertrude Elizabeth (1852–1854); Mabel (1855–1952); Alexander Mitchell Archibald McLaren (1856–1858); Margaret (1859–1938), and John Wallace Hozier MacLaren (1861–1915).

In 1857 MacLaren published The Fairy Family, A Series of Ballads & Metrical Tales, illustrated by the then Oxford undergraduate Edward Burne-Jones. He and his gymnasium featured in the 1850s novel The Adventures of Mr. Verdant Green by Cuthbert M. Bede. a pseudonym for Edward Bradley.

== Oxford Gymnasium ==
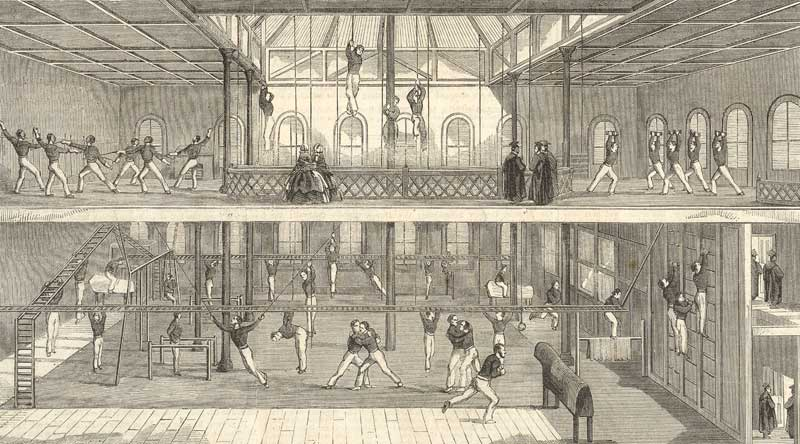
The interior of the Oxford Gymnasium - The Illustrated London News (1859)

In the early 1850s MacLaren equipped rooms in Oxford to teach fencing and gymnastics, and his endeavours were so successful that in 1858, assisted by his wife, he opened the renowned Oxford Gymnasium on Alfred Street at the University of Oxford. Designed by William Wilkinson, here MacLaren taught fencing and gymnastics to William Morris, Edward Burne-Jones and Richard Francis Burton among other prominent Oxford residents of the day as well as to the general public. MacLaren devised a system of regularly measuring his clients, regardless of age or sex, to determine the best exercise regime to develop their physical well-being.

A description of the gymnasium in The Illustrated London News in 1859 stated:

The physical condition of every pupil, child or adult, on his first entrance to the gymnasium, is carefully examined, and his height and weight, &c., carefully compared with his size, condition, and conformation of body, so that his exercises may be adapted to that part which is defective. Among other machines employed for this purpose is one invented by Mr. McLaren by which he can measure the depth and width of the chest at any point.

The gymnasium was a rectangular brick-built structure with round-headed windows and doors with an octagonal dome and lantern on its roof to provide ventilation, especially during poor weather when the gym's windows were closed. The building was centrally-heated, included space for fencing and was fitted with the latest gymnastic equipment of the day including a central mast or pole 60 feet tall in the atrium for climbing. The gymnasium's floor was made from a "carefully constructed padding, soft, thick and elastic."

The Oxford Gymnasium operated over two floors, with the top floor divided into two rooms - a fencing salon and a room for "modified exercises for young or delicate pupils." An additional one-storey building attached to the main building was added in 1861 to provide a private gymnasium for children. Women were also admitted.

The building survives today, having been renamed Blue Boar Court in 1989. Since 2017 it has been the base for the Oxford property management firm Locale.

== Training the Army ==
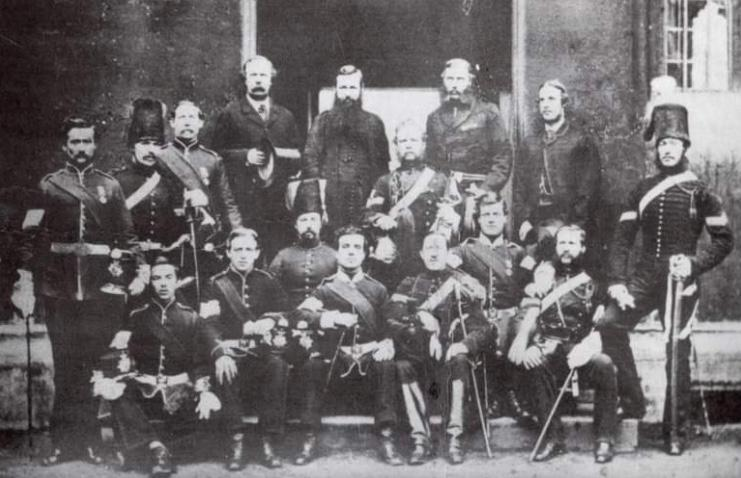
MacLaren (back row holding hat) and Captain Frederick Hammersley (in door, right) with the twelve NCO's and two of MacLaren's assistants at Oxford (1860)

During the Crimean War about 27,000 British troops died - the majority not as a result of wounds in battle but of disease. Investigations after the War decided that so many had died owing to their poor physical condition, resulting in their inability to fight off the effects of the diseases. In 1859 the War Office commissioned a report into the physical training systems in the armies of France and German. The final report stated that the French army had had a gymnastic physical training regime since the 1840s, with a central gymnastics training school founded in 1852; while the Prussian army had introduced military gymnastics training in 1842. Colonel Hamilton firmly advised that the War Office should institute a similar system of gymnastics training for the British Army.

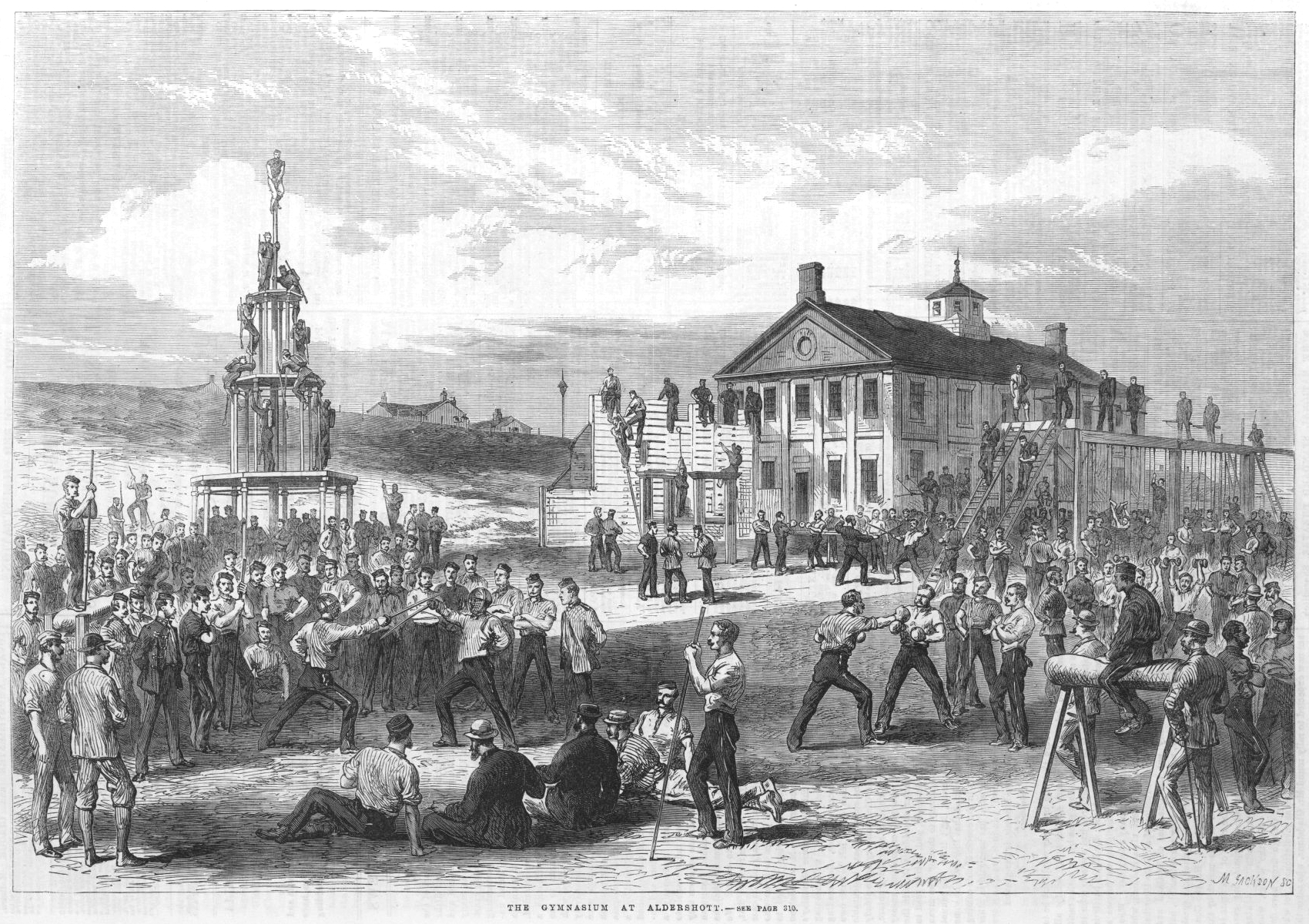
'The Gymnasium at Aldershott' - built to MacLaren's design - The Illustrated London News (1868)

Major Frederick Hammersley and twelve carefully selected non-commissioned officers (NCOs) were put through a twelve month course of physical training in Oxford under MacLaren. MacLaren used the techniques he had developed in his gymnasium, charting the physical changes in the men with each of the NCO's being photographed before and after their training and regularly measured to check their development. On completing the course it was apparent that each man's physical fitness had considerably improved and they became the foundation of what was to be called the Army Gymnastic Staff (AGS). This later become the Royal Army Physical Training Corps. A gymnasium similar to MacLaren's at Oxford was built at Aldershot. Soon after eight additional military gymnasiums were built to MacLaren's design including that at Sandhurst (1862), now the Library, and Brompton Barracks (1863).

== Summerfield House School ==
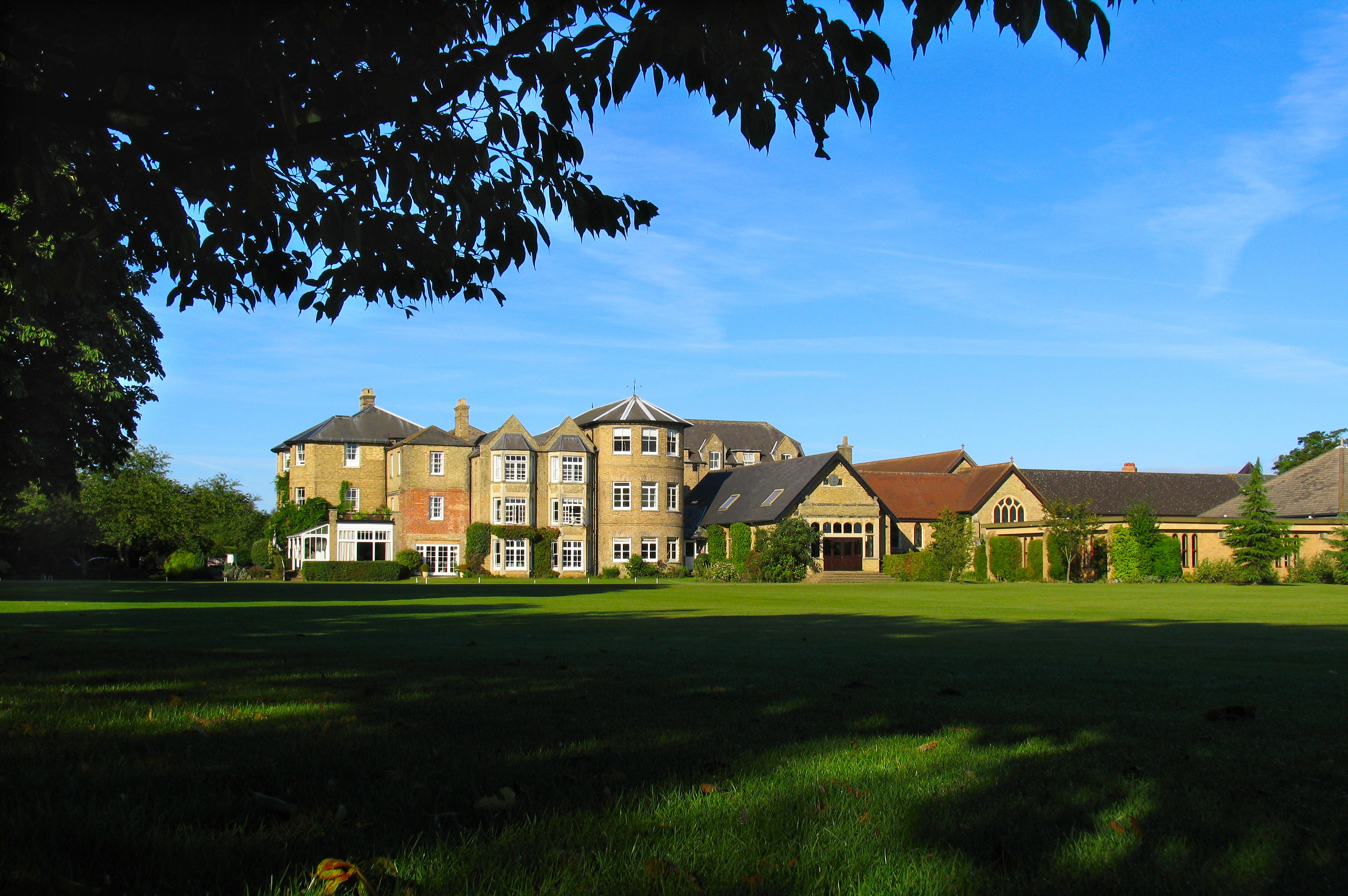
Summerfield House School from its playing fields (2015)

In 1864 Maclaren and his wife Gertrude MacLaren opened a school in Oxford, Summerfield House School (which still exists today as Summer Fields School). In 1871 MacLaren, described as a 'Schoolmaster and Professor of Gymnastics,' was living at Summerfield House School with his schoolmistress wife Gertrude and their children Mabel, Margaret and John in addition to three servants and 39 boy boarders aged between 9 and 14.

Over the years the school grew and needed more staff, two of whom married into the MacLaren family: the Reverend Dr Charles Williams ("Doctor"), who took over the scholarship form from Mrs MacLaren and married Mabel MacLaren in 1879; and the Reverend Hugh Alington, who married Margaret MacLaren in 1885 and took over the boys' games. The school remained in the hands of the MacLaren, Williams, and Alington families for its first 75 years. Among the school's old boys are Prime Minister Harold Macmillan and Archibald Wavell, 1st Earl Wavell, the Viceroy of India.

== Later life ==
The author of various popular works on physical training, Archibald MacLaren's 1869 book A System of Physical Education, Theoretical and Practical ISBN 978-1164204442, 1164204440 was reviewed in Macmillan's Magazine:

It will be no news to the readers of this Magazine to tell them that to Mr. MacLaren of Oxford, more than to any other man living, is the cause of physical education indebted for the rapid strides it has of late effected in this country. His magnificent Gymnasium at the University, and the marvellous results there produced, constitute only a small portion of the work he has been for many years accomplishing. The British Army is now trained on his principles, and in Gymnasia invented by him. His last effort is worthy to be placed on a level with any of his former achievements. It is a little book, but it contains the refined wisdom and experience of a quarter of a century; it throws open to all the world the knowledge obtained in endless studies, experiments, and meditation.

MacLaren died aged 64 at his home Summerfield House School near Oxford in February 1884 and was buried in the cemetery in Summertown, Oxford. He left an estate valued at £13,649 4s 6d.

== Selected bibliography ==
- The Fairy Family: A Series of Ballads and Metrical Tales Illustrating the Fairy Mythology of Europe, Longman & Co., London (1857) ISBN 1293704865, 978-1293704868
- Training, in Theory and Practice Macmillan and Co. (1866) ISBN 0364877383, 978-0364877388
- A Military System of Gymnastic Exercises and a System of Fencing, HMSO (1868)
- A System of Physical Education, Theoretical and Practical, Clarendon Press (1869)
