= Army School of Physical Training =

Coordinates: 51.2642°N 0.7562°W

- Active: 1860-Present
- Country: United Kingdom
- Branch: British Army
- Type: Training
- Role: Physical Training
- Garrison/HQ: Aldershot, Hampshire

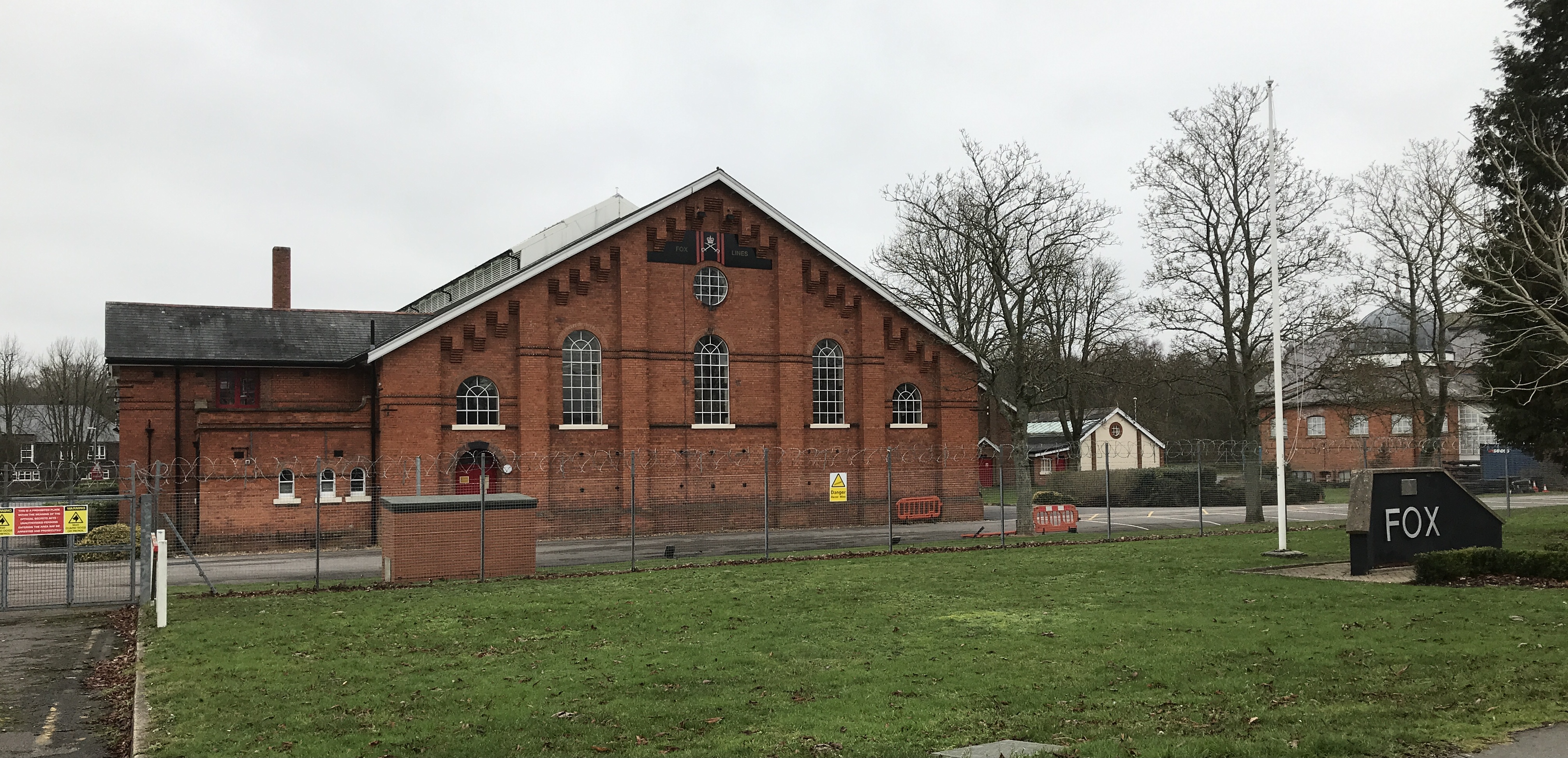
Fox Gymnasium on Fox Lines from Queen's Avenue (2021)

The Army School of Physical Training (ASPT) is the headquarters of the Royal Army Physical Training Corps (RAPTC) and the central training establishment for physical education, physical fitness and sports instructors in the British Army. It is located in Fox Lines, Aldershot, Hampshire, England.

== See also ==
- Royal Army Physical Training Corps Museum
