= North Camp railway station =

Railway station in Surrey, England

North Camp
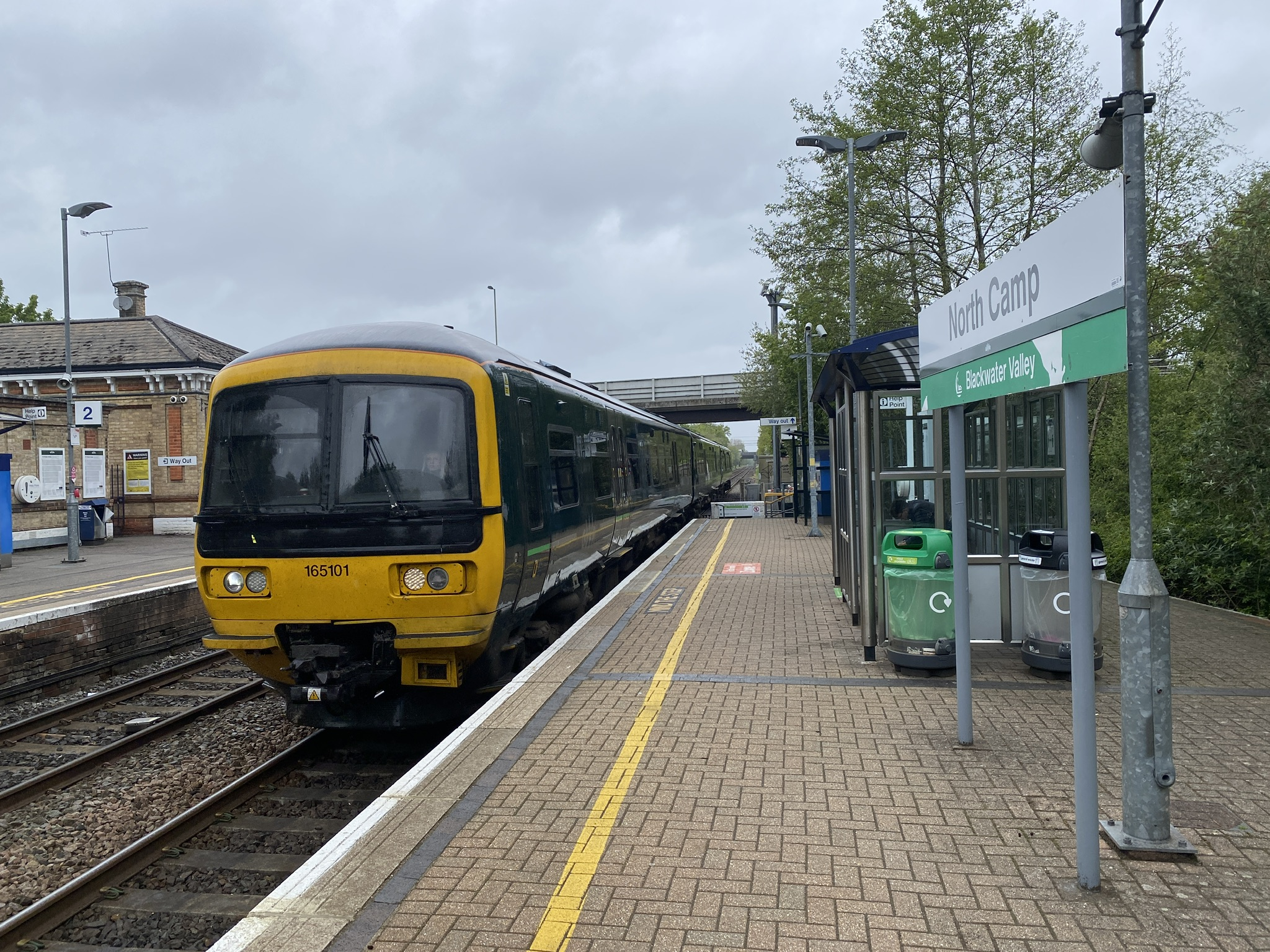
- A Class 165 unit at platform 1

General information
- Location: Ash Vale, Borough of Guildford, England
- Coordinates: 51.276°N 0.731°W
- Grid reference: SU886537
- Manager: Great Western Railway
- Platforms: 2

Other information
- Station code: NCM
- Classification: DfT category E

History
- Opened: 1858

Passengers
- 2020/21: ▼59,002
- 2021/22: ▲0.169 million
- 2022/23: ▲0.209 million
- 2023/24: ▲0.226 million
- 2024/25: ▲0.251 million
Location
Notes
- Passenger statistics from the Office of Rail and Road

North Camp railway station serves the civil parish of Ash, in Surrey, England. It takes its name from the nearby North Camp area of Farnborough. The station is managed by Great Western Railway, which provides services on the North Downs Line between Reading and Gatwick Airport, via Guildford Redhill. It lies 1/2 mile (0.8 km) from Ash Vale on the Alton line.

== History ==
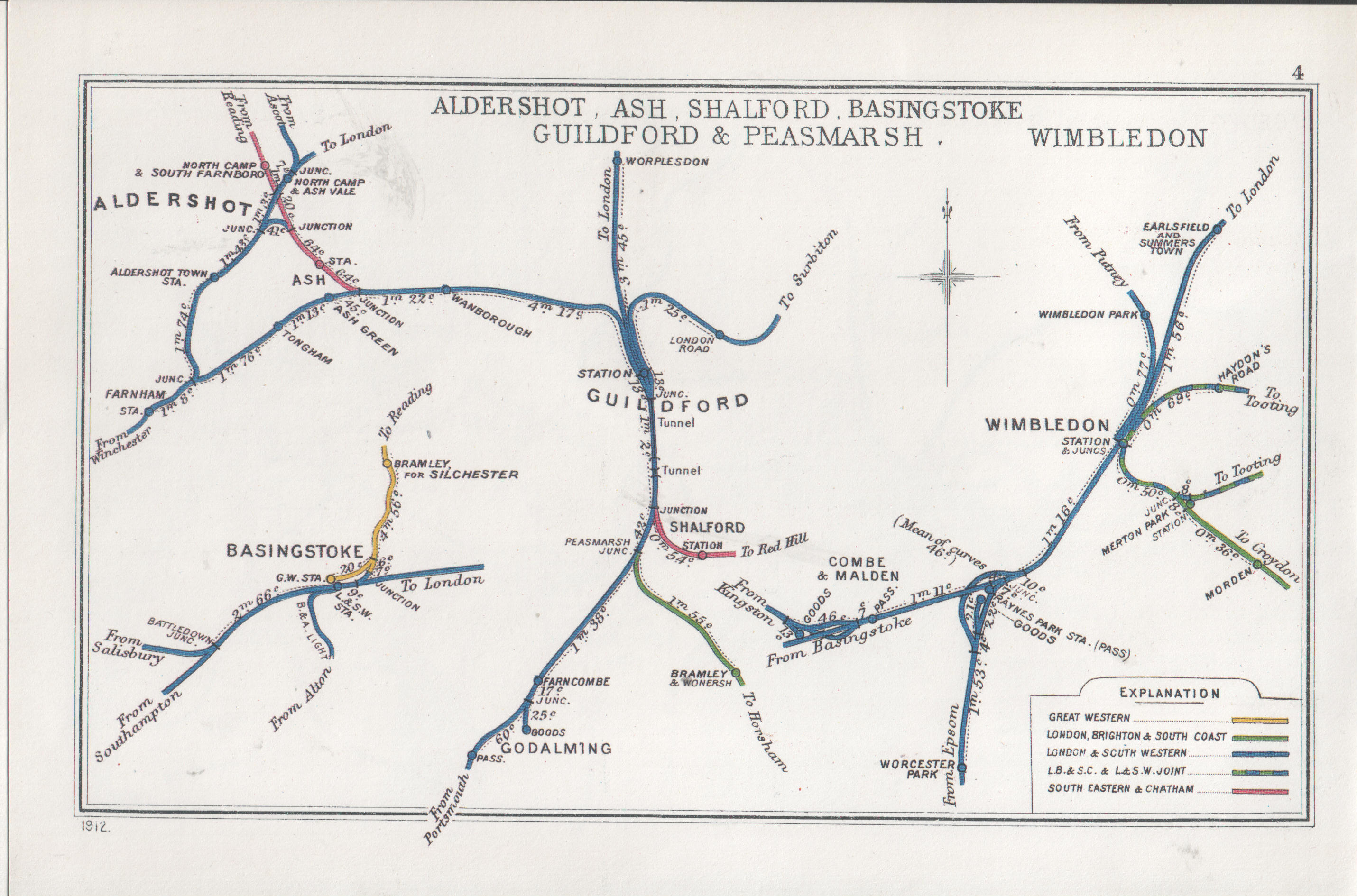
A 1912 Railway Clearing House map of lines around the station

The station was opened in 1858 as North Camp, Aldershot. It was renamed Aldershot Camp in 1863, Aldershot (North Camp) in 1879, Aldershot (North Camp) & South Farnborough in June 1910 and Aldershot North in July 1923. It received its present name in March 1924.

== Facilities ==
The station is staffed on a part-time basis; (Note: It is open mornings and early afternoons, Monday-Saturday.) there is bicycle storage and a car park with 37 spaces.

There is a level crossing at the Reading end of the station.

== Services ==
All services at North Camp are operated by Great Western Railway, using Class 165 and 166 diesel multiple units.

The typical off-peak service is two trains per hour in each direction between Reading and Gatwick Airport. During the late evenings, the service is reduced to hourly in each direction. On Sundays, only one eastbound train per hour runs to Gatwick Airport, with one train per hour running only as far as Redhill.

Preceding station	National Rail	Following station
Ash	Great Western Railway North Downs Line	Farnborough North

== Gallery ==
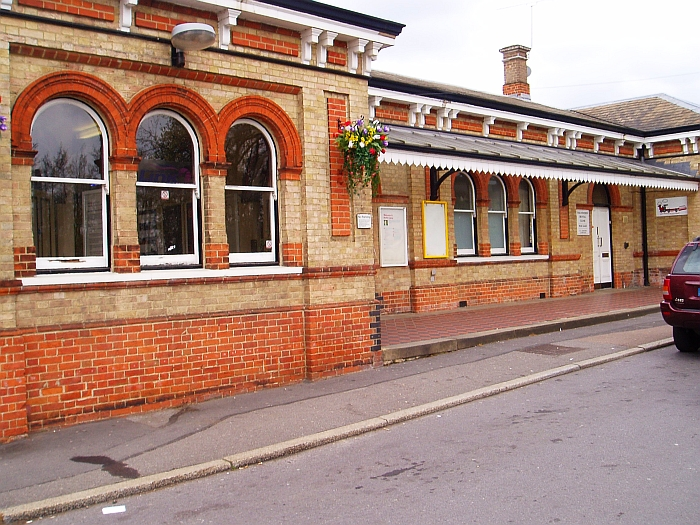
The main station building

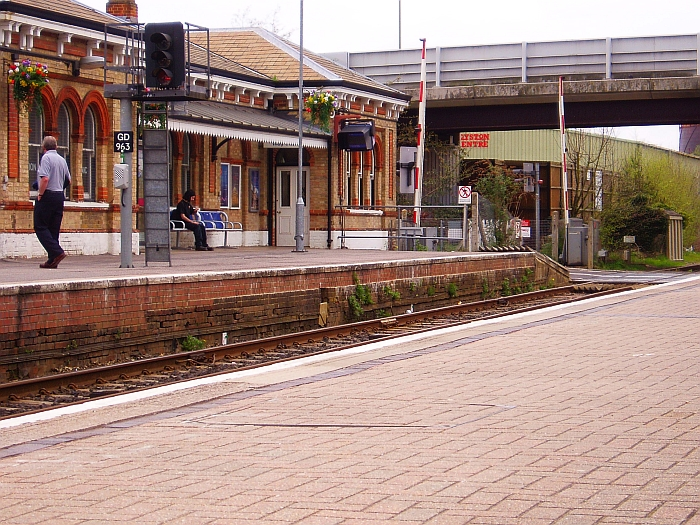
Platform 1

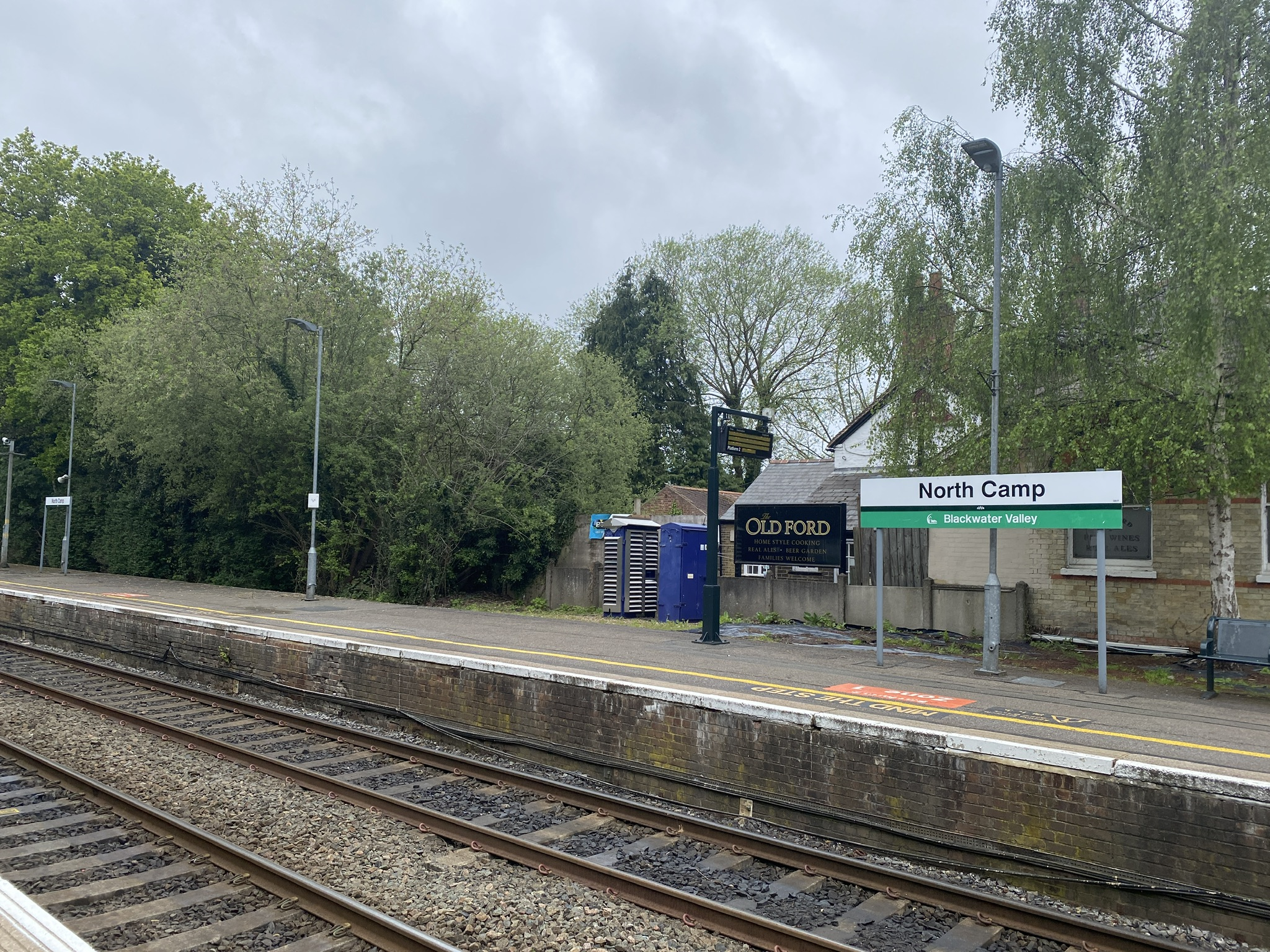
Platform 2
