= St Peter's church, Ash =

Church in Ash, Surrey, England

Coordinates: 51°14′57″N 0°42′56″W

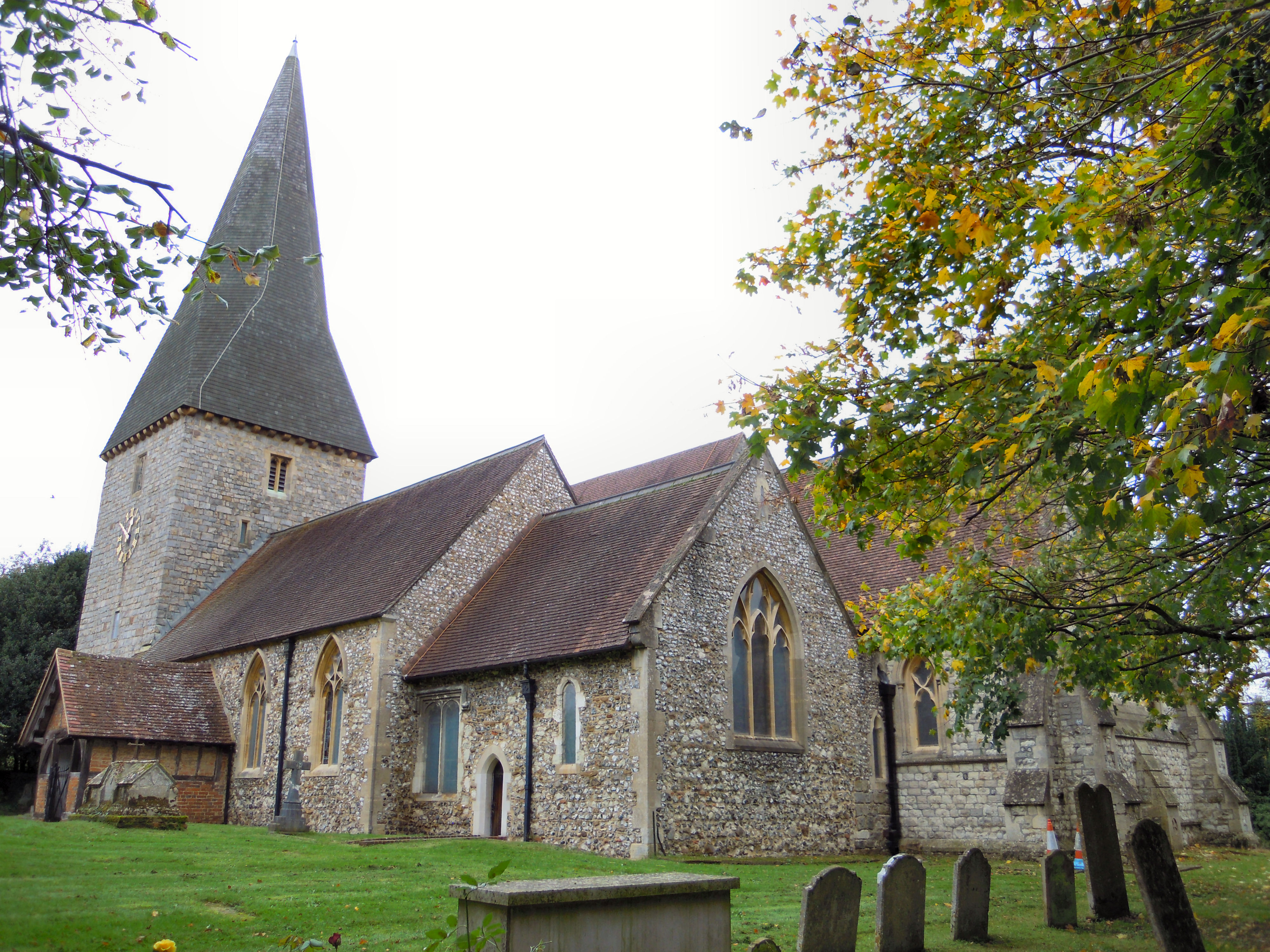
St Peter's church in Ash, Surrey in 2017

St Peter's Church is the Church of England parish church for the village of Ash in Surrey. Of 12th-century origin with later additions, the church has been Grade II* listed on the Register of Historic England since 1967. It is part of Aldershot Deanery in the Diocese of Guildford.

== History ==
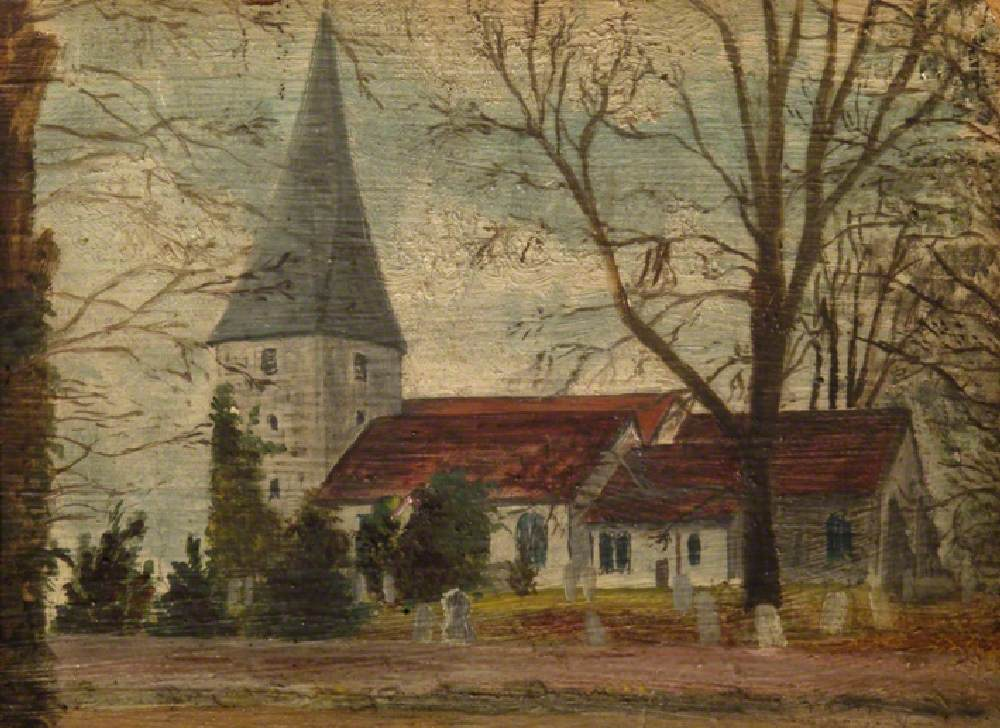
St Peter's church c1910 - John James Miles (1857–1928)

A church, probably built of wood, is recorded in the Domesday Book of 1086 when Azor, one of the most powerful Anglo-Saxon landowners at the time of Edward the Confessor, is listed as owning the land. It seems probable that Azor had not sided with Harold Godwinson as he was still the landowner at Ash after the Battle of Hastings in 1066. On his death Azor gifted his lands including the church at Ash to Chertsey Abbey (also dedicated to Saint Peter) in return for prayers for his soul. From then until the English Reformation Chertsey Abbey received taxes from the parish of Ash and had the right to appoint the priest in charge. As a result of the Dissolution of the Monasteries under Henry VIII St Peter's church at Ash passed to the Crown. When later during the reign of Edward VI the Crown wished to extend its hunting area to Windsor Castle the area they needed belonged to Winchester College, which necessitated an exchange of land. As a result, the parish at Ash passed to Winchester College, which remains the parish's Patron to this day, giving the college the right of approval over each new incumbent. It was made a separate parish from that in Frimley in 1866.

St Peter's was originally part of the Diocese of Winchester but when the Diocese of Guildford was created in 1927 the village of Ash became one of 163 parishes in the new Diocese.

== Design ==
The "very good" south door with its "very delicate" carving attributed to stonemasons associated with Chertsey Abbey and its adjacent walls are c1170 with some 13th-century remains in the chancel. The 15th-century broach spire-topped tower is built of ironstone with a peal of six bells - five dating from 1798 and the sixth, the Peace Bell - added in 1919. This treble bell was added at the same time that the cracked tenor bell was recast. Situated on the church's south-west corner, the tower is short and square with small louvred openings at the top of each wall with irregular openings placed elsewhere. The south porch is of the 16th century. By the 19th century the Norman church was becoming too small for the growing congregation and it was restored and extended in about 1865 at which time the north aisle and north chancel chapel were constructed. The nave is built of roughly coursed flint and sandstone rubble. The large window in the east end is 19th-century of three lights in the late 13th-century style, but a single 13th-century lancet window is still to be found in the south chancel wall. In the Victorian north wall of the nave is reset a small 12th-century round-headed light, much repaired, while the three windows in the south wall date to the Victorian rebuilding.

Inside, the church has a tiled floor with a four-bay arcade with round columns to the north aisle and a 14th-century chalk chancel arch. There is a two-bay arcade with round columns between the chancel and the north chapel with carved foliage capitals in high relief surmounting the columns. The chancel is 30 feet long by 14 feet 3 inches wide, and the nave is 58 feet long by 24 feet wide. A 13th-century piscina with pointed head and half-projecting bowl can be found on the south chancel wall. There is a marble and mosaic reredos in the new chapel and modern 20th-century screens. The stone pulpit is of the 19th century, while the 17th-century octagonal wooden font with its lead-lined bowl stands on a central stem of eight columns. There is an ornate stone wall monument on the east wall of the old chancel to the Reverend John Harris, who died in 1759, while the corresponding monument to his wife Judith Harris (died 1765) can be found on the north arcade of the chancel. On the south wall of the old chancel is a brass tablet to Thomas Manory dated 1516, while below is another to Anne Vyne, his daughter and heir. A shield above these bears an engrailed cross.

== Notable burials ==
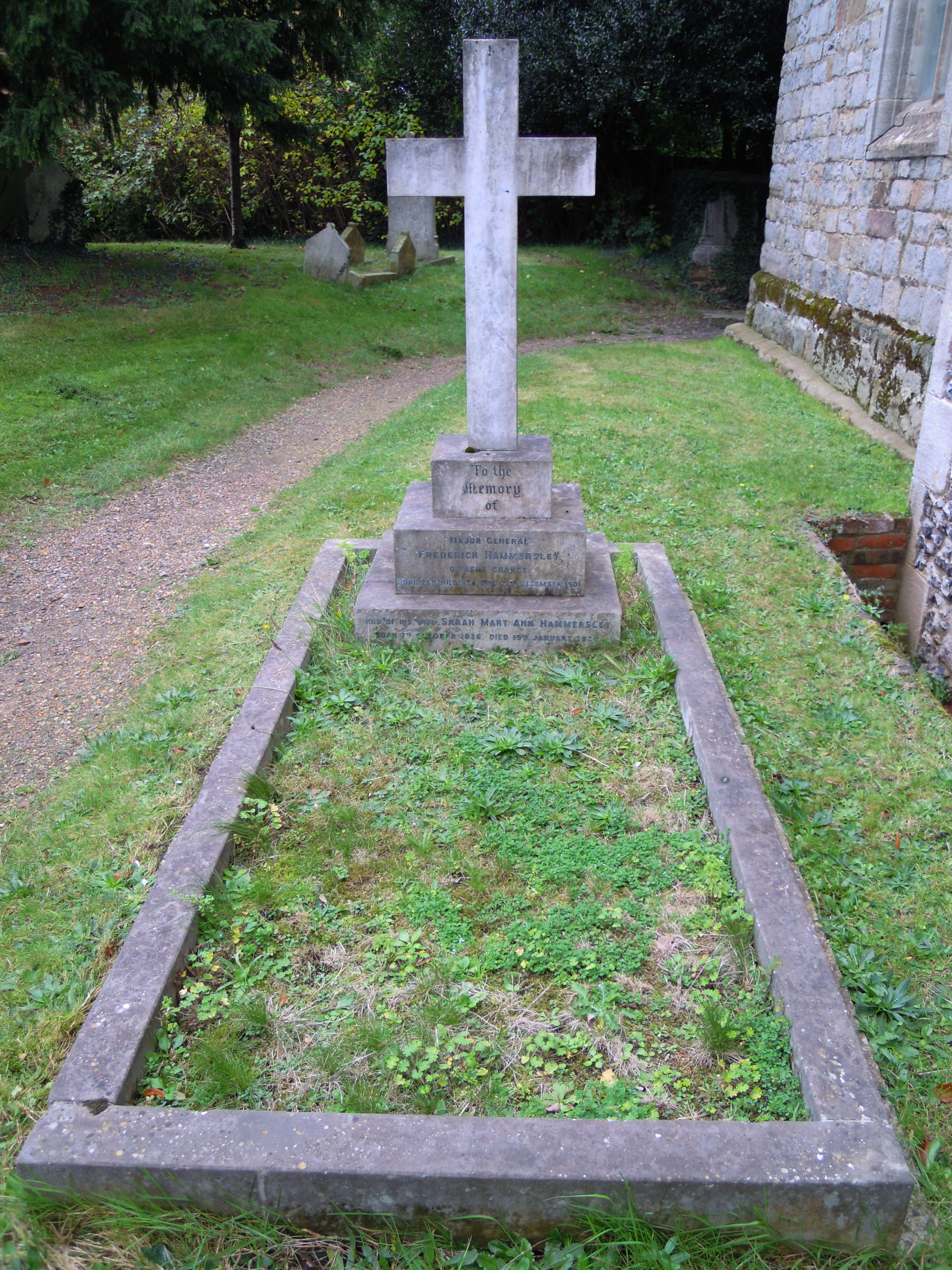
The grave of Major-General Frederick Hammersley in the churchyard of St Peter's church, Ash

- Major-General Frederick Hammersley (1824–1901) of Ashe Grange worshipped in the church and is buried in the churchyard.
