= Maria Angel =

Academic and founder of charitable organizations

Maria Angel MBE is a British academic. In 2008, Angel founded and became daily operations director of the 'Normandy Youth Club–The N-Factor' charity organization located in Surrey, England.

== Career ==
Angel holds a BA (Hons) in Business and Management, as well as a PGCE certification, a QTLS status, and an FCMI. Now a former sixth form teacher, presently handles high-profile artistes as a Public Relations Consultant.

== The Normandy Youth Club ==
Angel founded the 'Normandy Youth Club–The N-Factor' charitable institution in January 2008. The community organization was targeted to help combat the increasing incidents of youth crime in Normandy, Surrey, England and its surrounding hamlets.

The group was staffed and run by volunteers. It was based out of Normandy Village Hall and catered specifically to rural youth aged eight to 18 years of age. The club was aimed at young people from disadvantaged and marginalised communities in Normandy and its surrounding hamlets, including those from minority group communities. The club was closed in October 2018 due to a lack of funding.

=== Recognition ===
The Normandy Youth Club was recognised by UK Prime Minister Gordon Brown and his wife Sarah in 2018. Maria Angel was recognised by Her Majesty The Queen Elizabeth II in the 2018 New Year Honours.

== Personal and organization honours ==
Year	Organisation	Award	Achievement
2009	High Sheriff of Surrey	High Sheriff Youth Award	"Contributed towards making your community safer and stronger, by reaching out and helping others. The Award also conveys the gratitude of all those who live in Surrey for the way your project helps to reduce and prevent crime amongst young people in the country".
2009	Borough of Guildford Mayor	The Mayor's Award for Community Service	"For recognition of their outstanding contribution to the community".
2009	Surrey Police	Surrey Police Local Heroes Award	"The Community Cohesion category and thereby receives the grateful thanks of Surrey Police and the citizens of the county for their actions and dedication to help create safe neighbourhoods in Surrey".
2010	Tesco	Tesco Community of the Year Award	"National recognition for serving the community".
2010	10 Downing Street	Breakfast Reception with Sarah Brown	"National recognition for serving the community".
2010	High Sheriff of Surrey	High Sheriff Youth Award	"Contributed towards making your community safer and stronger, by reaching out and helping others". "The Award also conveys the gratitude of all those who live in Surrey for the way your project helps to reduce and prevent crime amongst young people in the country".
2010	Women of the Year Lunch	Women of the Year Lunch	"Recognition as a Woman of Achievement 2010, on the basis of her own merit and achievement and is nominated by a member of the Woman of the Year Nominating Council because of her special contribution to society or the workplace".
2011	BBC	BBC First Click Digital Champion	"Providing the BBC First Click beginner’s computer courses at Normandy Day Centre Internet Café from the launch of the BBC campaign".
2011	Guildford Honorary Remembrancer	Women of the Year	"Honoured for her outstanding contribution… has changed the community’s attitude towards youngsters in the area. ...that there are people who feel socially excluded".
2011	Surrey Life Magazine	Surrey Life Community Hero	"Inspiring people who are already making a big difference in our communities… who you feel really make an impression on the quality of life in Surrey". The driving force behind the N-Factor youth club and the Normandy Day Centre Internet Café in her village".
2018	London Gazette	Member of the Most Excellent Order of the British Empire	"For services to the community in Normandy, Surrey".
2018	Times Educational Supplement (TES)	TES New Teacher of the Year Finalist. Terrace Pavilion reception at the House of Commons with Lord	"Recognized by her peers for her contribution to teaching".
