= The Concrete Elephant =

Sculpture by Barbara Jones

- Trollope & Colls White Elephant
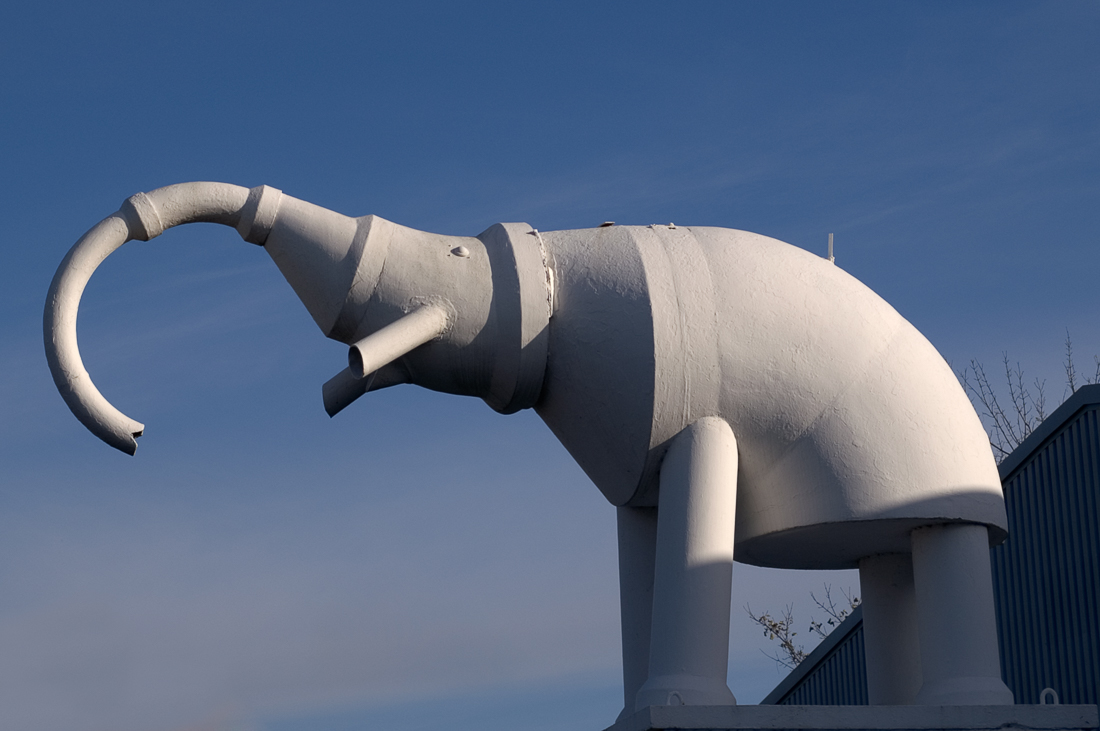
- Artist: Barbara Jones
- Year: 1963
- Type: Sculpture
- Medium: Concrete
- Subject: Elephants, Piping
- Location: Camberley, United Kingdom
- 51.33305°N 0.77101°W

The Concrete Elephant is a sculpture and local landmark standing along the A30 in Camberley on approach to The Meadows roundabout.

It was created by Barbara Jones for Trollope & Colls for the Lord Mayor's Show held on the 19 November 1963, carried on a yellow low loader with a pink and grey cab behind a person dressed as a zebra carrying a zebra crossing pole and light and a red post office telephone box. It was to represent their pioneering use of reinforced concrete in pipework.

The piece was installed in its current location in 1964, when Trollope & Colls gained permission to site the elephant at the entrance to their yard off the A30 London Road. Over the years the sculpture has faced a number of damages, in 1982 part of the trunk fell off, in 1993 the ears were stolen, and in November 1987, it was painted over with large black spots.
