= Blackwater Valley Path =

Long-distance footpath in South East England

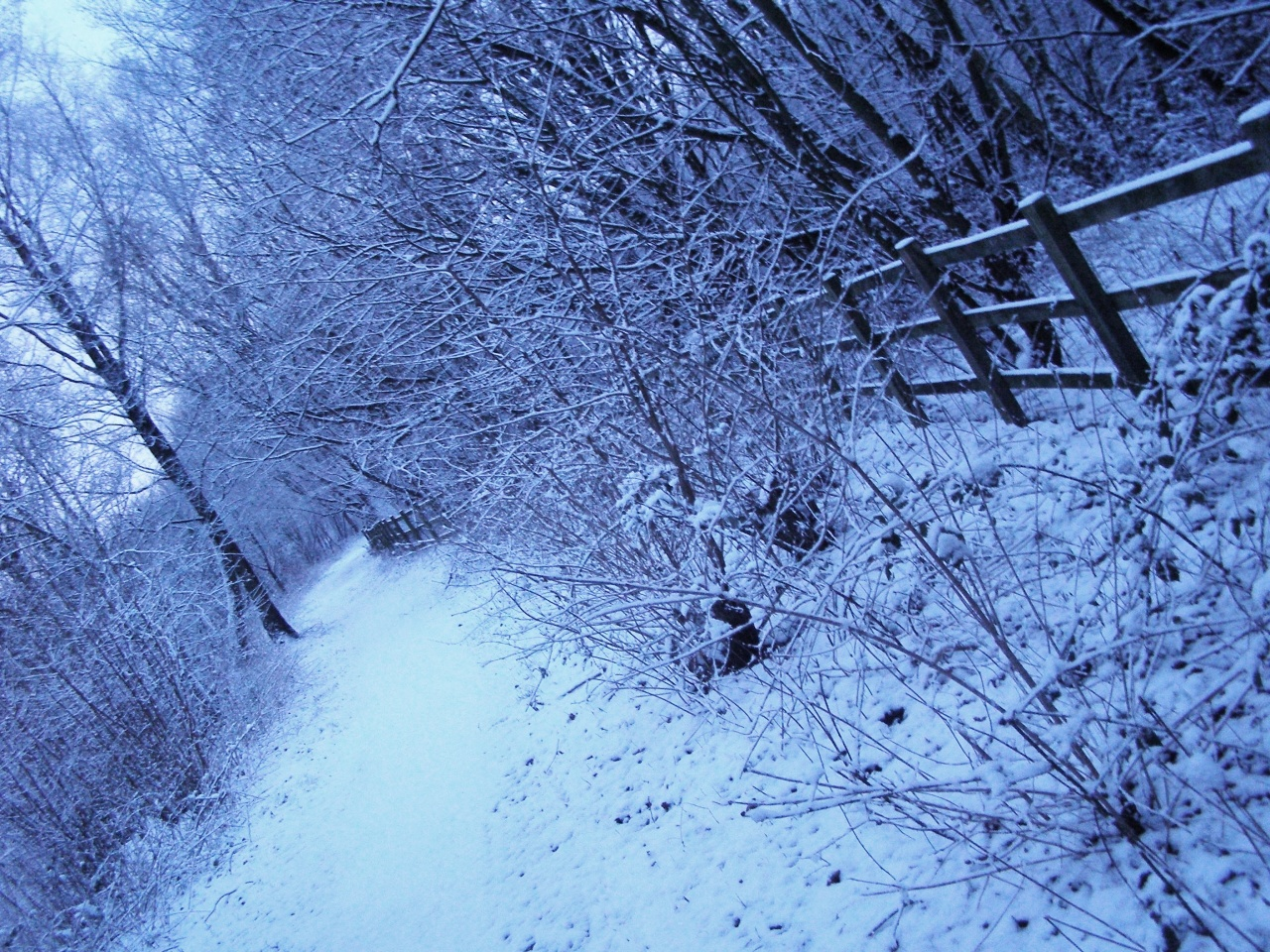
- Blackwater Valley Path in winter.
- Length: 23 mi (37 km)
- Location: Hampshire, Surrey, Berkshire.
- Trailheads: Rowhill Nature Reserve, Aldershot; Swallowfield51.380°N 0.957°W
- Use: Hiking

The Blackwater Valley Path follows the River Blackwater from its source in the Rowhill Nature Reserve in Aldershot to just beyond the point where it joins the River Whitewater near Swallowfield to become the Broadwater. This long-distance route covers 23 miles (37 km) and closely follows the River Blackwater using public rights-of-way as well as permissive footpaths and is waymarked. It is looked after by the Blackwater Valley Countryside Partnership.

The Surrey Heath section includes informal parks on reclaimed land at Blackwater Park and Watchmoor.

== See also ==
- Recreational walks in Hampshire
- Long-distance footpaths in the UK
