= Ken Ford (sculptor) =

British sculptor

Kenneth Ford (25 April 1930 – 29 August 2018) was a British sculptor, who was a 1955 Prix de Rome winner for sculpture at The British School At Rome. He studied at the Royal College of Art under Frank Dobson.

He was head of sculpture at Leicester Polytechnic (1967–1988) and a visiting lecturer at the former Frink School of Figurative Sculpture in Tunstall. In 2010, University of Leicester awarded him an Honorary Degree of Doctor of Letters for his contribution to the artistic life of Leicestershire and UK.

== Public Commissions ==
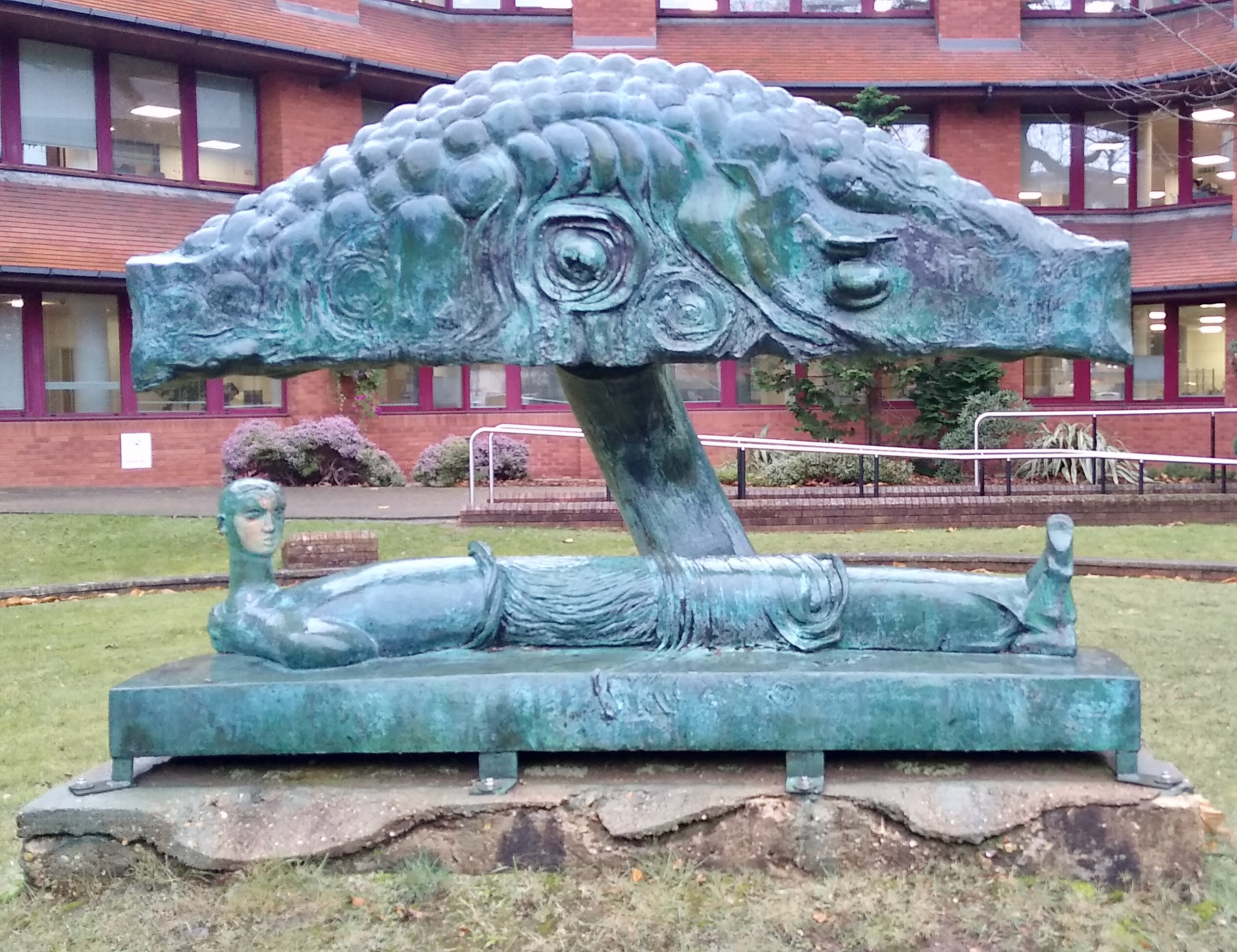
Into our first world Camberley, Surrey

In 1961 a competition led to commission for a work to symbolize the rebirth of Newcastle upon Tyne after wartime devastation. “Symbol of Rebirth”, celebrates evolution and rebirth, itself evolving from the primitive forms at the base rising to an embryonic form in a pelvic structure. Other public sculpture include the Sir Frank Whittle commemoration in Lutterworth and a 1993 work, “Into Our First World”, at Surrey Heath House at Camberley. This work is popular with the local community and a proposal to move it resulted in much local protest.

== Portrait of Ken Ford ==
Ford agreed to sit for Jon Edgar in Leicestershire during 2005. A terracotta head exists.
