= Camberley Kate =

British dog lover and eccentric (1895–1979)

'Camberley Kate' in 1966

Katherine Ward (13 June 1895 – 4 August 1979), affectionately known as Camberley Kate, was a British dog lover and eccentric who is estimated to have cared for over 600 dogs in her lifetime. She was well-known to residents of Camberley, Surrey, for what historian Arthur Bryant described as the "astonishing spectacle" of her pushing a wooden cart along Camberley High Street "surrounded by dogs of every size and species".

== Early life ==
On 13 June 1895, Ward was born in Middlesbrough, Yorkshire. Both of her parents died by the time Ward was ten years old. Consequently, she was raised by her aunt, who was strictly religious. Ward described her aunt's home as having an "atmosphere of disapproval". Aged 19, she left home to work in domestic service in Bradford.

Why Ward initially moved south from Yorkshire to Camberley is not recorded, but the BBC speculates it may be that she moved to work as a servant at the nearby Royal Military Academy. In 1943, Ward bought a small terraced cottage in Yorktown near Camberley for £600.

== Dogs ==
Around the time Ward bought her Camberley home, she found a lame greyhound on the doorstep of the local vet. He was due to be euthanised. Ward rescued him, and said they subsequently became "inseparable". He lived for a further eight and a half years. When he died, Ward decided to take in other needy animals in his memory.

Ward soon began to accumulate more animals by various means: some left by strangers tied to her front door, some left on her doorstep in a shopping bag, some strays from the local police station. Ward described one incident where a dog was "flung out of a car in the middle of the London Road, by the [Royal Military] Academy, among all the traffic". She left her other dogs to rescue it.

Ward became well-known in Camberley for what historian Arthur Bryant described as the "astonishing spectacle" of her pushing a cart along Camberley High Street "surrounded by dogs of every size and species". Someone had constructed for her a cart made of wooden planks, painted with the words "Ward Stray Dogs". She took daily walks to the town centre, transporting inside the cart the sick, small, or elderly of her dogs, with as many as a dozen others walking alongside the cart. The BBC referred to her as an eccentric.

In a 1960 interview with Tonight, at which time she had thirteen dogs, she was asked what made her start taking in dogs. She answered "I was a Yorkshire woman, living down in the South. I was pretty lonely. Living on the main road I saw so many dogs tied up, and so many run over. [...] So I just dedicated my life to them. I've had dogs of all sorts all sizes. Many I've replaced; some are all over England".

Bryant wrote that his correspondence with Ward showed a religious aspect of her devotion to animals. She wrote "I always say they are His. I am just looking after them. I love to feel I am the unknown hand (never mentioned in the story) to get ready the stable for His coming on earth".

In 1975, Ward said she had just taken in her 500th dog. It is estimated that by the end of her life she had cared for over 600 dogs.

== Final years and legacy ==
In a 1975 interview, Ward explained that whenever one of her dogs died she had previously taken in another one, but at the age of 80 she could no longer do this. At this point she had 24 dogs.

As her health deteriorated and she suffered a number of strokes, Ward moved to the nearby Kingsclear residential home. Ward had set up a trust fund to ensure her dogs could continue to be looked after once she died. At this point she had seven remaining dogs, which were put into kennels. She died on 4 August 1979 and was buried in the churchyard of St Michael's church in Camberley.

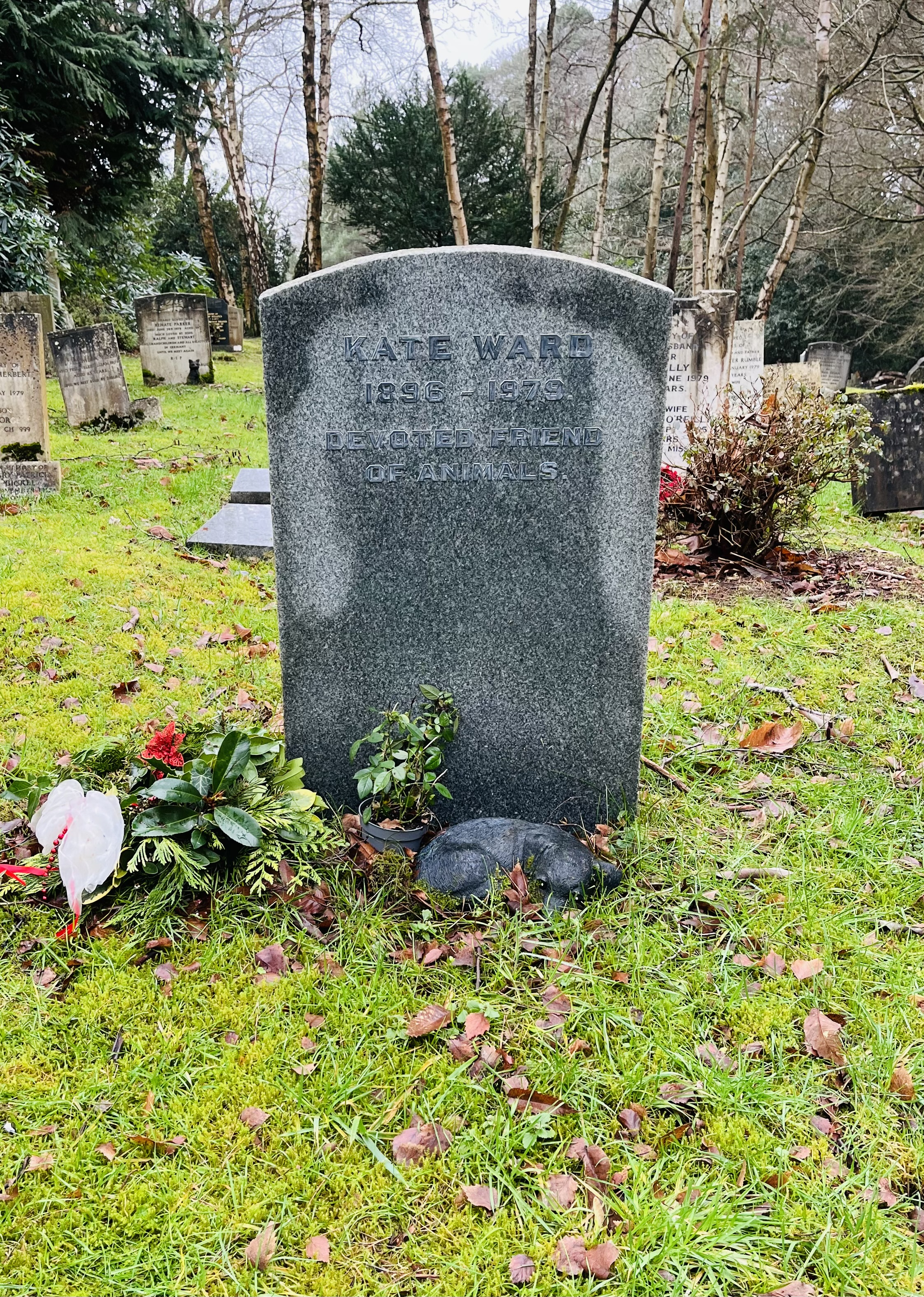
The grave of 'Camberley Kate' in the churchyard of St Michael's church

After her death, there were calls for a memorial plaque to be placed in Camberley in her honour. A development of Camberley retirement flats, Katherine Court, was named after her in 2000.

European director of the Animals & Society Institute, Kim Stallwood, cites her as an early influence on his animal advocacy. Stallwood states that Ward embodied many contradictions, such as being someone who preferred the company of animals to humans, but nonetheless quietly donated money she could scarcely afford to help the human poor and sick. He asks "Did she confirm or overturn the stereotype of the animal lover as misanthrope?"
