= Camberley =

Town in Surrey, England

Coordinates: 51°20′06″N 0°44′31″W

- Town
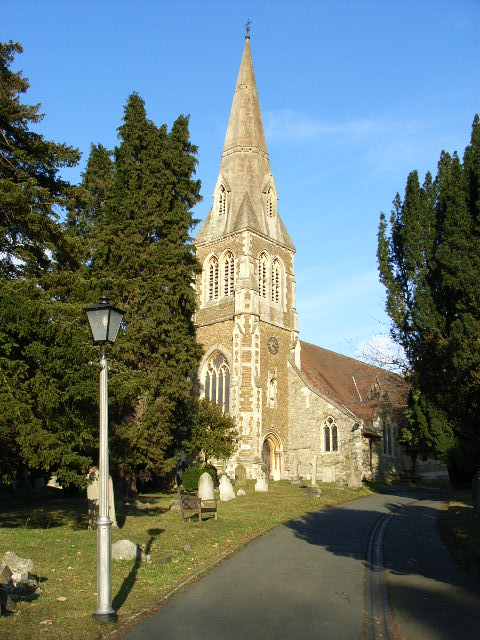
- St Michael's Church, Camberley

- Location within Surrey
- Area: 16.78 km^{2} (6.48 sq mi)
- Population: 36,783
  - Density: 2,192/km^{2} (5,680/sq mi)
- OS grid reference: TQ234561
- District: Surrey Heath
- Shire county: Surrey
- Region: South East
- Country: England
- Sovereign state: United Kingdom
- Post town: Camberley
- Postcode district: GU15, GU16
- Dialling code: 01276
- Police: Surrey
- Fire: Surrey
- Ambulance: South East Coast
- UK Parliament: Surrey Heath

Camberley /ˈkæmbərliː/ is a town in north-west Surrey, England, around 29 miles (47 kilometres) south-west of central London. It is in the Borough of Surrey Heath and is close to the county boundaries with Hampshire and Berkshire. Known originally as "Cambridge Town", it was assigned its current name by the General Post Office in 1877.

Until the start of the 19th century, the area was a sparsely populated area of infertile land known as Bagshot or Frimley Heath. Following the construction of the Royal Military College at Sandhurst in 1812, a small settlement grew up to the south and became known as Yorktown (also spelled York Town). A second British Army institute, the Staff College, opened to the east in 1862, and the nucleus of Cambridge Town was laid out at around the same time. The two settlements grew together over the following decades and are now contiguous. Much of the town centre dates from the late 20th and early 21st centuries, including The Atrium, a retail, entertainment and residential complex, opened in 2008.

Transport links through the area began to improve with the opening of the London-Basingstoke turnpike in 1728, now the A30 London Road. The Basingstoke Canal, which runs to the south of Camberley, was completed in 1794 and the wharf at Frimley was used to supply building materials for the Royal Military College. Blackwater station, on the Reading to Guildford line, opened to the west of Yorktown in 1849 and Camberley station, on the Ascot to Aldershot line, followed in 1878. In the second half of the 20th century, improvements to the road network in the area included the construction of the M3 motorway and the Blackwater Valley relief road.

The area has a strong links to the performing arts – Camberley Theatre was opened in 1966 and Elmhurst Ballet School was based in the town until 2004. Among the former residents are the Victorian composer, Arthur Sullivan, who attended Yorktown School as a child, the musician Rick Wakeman, who lived in Camberley during the 1980s, and the actress, Simone Ashley, who was born in the town in 1995. There are several works of public art in Camberley, including The Concrete Elephant, which was installed in 1964 on the London Road, having been commissioned for the Lord Mayor's Show of the previous year. Into Our First World, a sculpture by Ken Ford, is on display outside the borough council offices on Knoll Road.

== Toponymy ==
Camberley was assigned its current name on 15 January 1877 by the General Post Office. Previously, the settlement had been known as "Cambridge Town" and the change was made to prevent letters and parcels being misdirected to Cambridge in the East of England. The new name is a portmanteau of "Cam" (the name of a local stream), "Amber Hill" (an area of high ground identified in a survey of 1607 by the cartographer, John Norden) and "—ley" (a suffix found in local toponyms, such as Frimley and Yateley, derived from the Old English lee meaning "shelter" or lea meaning "pasture" or "meadow").

As Cambridge Town, the settlement was originally named for Prince George, Duke of Cambridge, who laid the foundation stone of the Staff College in December 1859. Similarly, Yorktown (sometimes spelled York Town), to the west of Camberley, was named for Prince Frederick, Duke of York and Albany, who authorised the construction of the Royal Military College in December 1802. (Note: Yorktown was known as New Town until 1831, when the named was changed in honour of Prince Frederick.) The dukes were commanders-in-chief of the British Army at the times when the two colleges were founded. The inns, the Duke of York and The Cambridge Hotel, were among the first buildings to be constructed in Yorktown and Camberley respectively.

Several of the street names in Camberley and Yorktown are named for early local landowners, including Teckels Avenue (after John Teckel, builder of Teckels Castle), Stanhope Road (after the family of Griselda Stanhope, Teckel’s wife) and Sparvell Walk (after David Sparvell, a town alderman). Watchetts Drive takes its name from a former manor field (Watchetts is derived from woad scaet, meaning land where woad grows). Osnaburgh Parade is named after Osnaburgh, an estate in Fife held by Prince Frederick.

== Geography ==
Camberley is in the far west of Surrey, adjacent to the boundaries of Hampshire's Hart district and Berkshire's Bracknell Forest district. It lies directly between the A30 national route and M3 motorway (junction 4 exit). It is at the northern edge of the Blackwater Valley conurbation, 5 miles (8.0 km) north of Farnborough, 8 miles (13 km) south of Bracknell and 17 miles (27 km) east of Basingstoke.

The town of Blackwater, 3 km (1.9 mi) to the west is identified by the Government Statistical Service (including its ONS office) as within the Camberley Built-up-Area but is in the Hart District of Hampshire and has its own town council (both take in Hawley).

Camberley primarily lies on the Bagshot Beds, deposited in the Eocene. This sandy layer contains seams of clay and areas of pebble gravel.

== History ==
Before the 19th century, the area now occupied by Camberley was referred to as Bagshot or Frimley Heath. An Iron Age fort, among many examples known as Caesar's Camp, was to the north of this area alongside the Roman road The Devil's Highway. The Intenarium Curiosum, published in 1724, describes a collection of Roman pottery around the area, and a further collection was discovered at Frimley Green in the late 20th century. In the Middle Ages, the area was part of Windsor Forest.

In the 17th century, the area along the turnpike road through Bagshot Heath (now the A30) was known as a haunt of highwaymen, such as William Davies – also known as the Golden Farmer (Note: Davis was tried and hanged at what is now the Jolly Farmer roundabout.) – and Claude Duval. The land remained largely undeveloped and uncultivated due to a sandy topsoil making it unsuitable for farming. In A tour thro' the whole island of Great Britain, written between 1724 and 1726, Daniel Defoe described the area as barren and sterile; "a mark of the just resentment shew'd by Heaven upon the Englishmen's pride… horrid and frightful to look on, not only good for little, but good for nothing". A brick tower was built on top of The Knoll in the 1770s, by John Norris of Blackwater. It may have been used for communications but there is no firm evidence. The remains are now known as The Obelisk.

=== 19th century ===
The town as it now stands has its roots in the building of The Royal Military College, which later became the Royal Military Academy, Sandhurst, in 1812. A settlement known as "New Town" grew in the area around the college which in 1831 was renamed Yorktown, after Prince Frederick, Duke of York and Albany. At this time, the population was 702. In 1848, the first parish church of St. Michael, Yorktown was built by Henry Woodyer, in an area formerly part of Frimley, itself only a chapelry of Ash. Later, the Staff College was established to the east of the academy, and a property speculator built the nearby Cambridge Hotel.

During the 19th century, Camberley grew in size. This was given added impetus with the arrival of the branch-line railway and railway station in 1878 and a reputation for healthy air, due to the vast number of pine trees, which were said to be good for those suffering from pulmonary disorders. By the end of the century the population had reached 8,400. Since then, the town has absorbed the original settlement of Yorktown, which is now regarded as part of Camberley.

=== 20th century ===
The Southern Scott Scramble, the first known motorcycle scrambling event, took place on Camberley Heath on 29 March 1924. The event, won by A.B. Sparks, attracted a crowd in the thousands and is considered to be the first instance of what later developed in the sport of motocross. During the Second World War, the Old Dean common was used as an instruction camp of the Free French Forces. The Kremer prize was conceived in the Cambridge Hotel in Camberley in 1959 after Henry Kremer toured a Microcell factory.

The defunct Barossa Golf Club, on Barossa Common, was founded in 1893 and continued until the Second World War.

The Old Dean housing estate was built in the 1950s on the "Old Dean Common" for residents of heavily bombed Surrey-area's homeless after the Second World War. Many of the roads on that half of the Old Dean are named after areas of London, with the others named after places on the common.

In 1969 there was an outbreak of rabies when a dog, just released from a six month quarantine after returning from Germany, attacked two people on Camberley Common. The scare resulted in restriction orders for dogs and large-scale shoots to carry out the destruction of foxes and other wildlife.

=== 21st century ===
After debate and delay (plans having been discussed for over half a decade), in 2006, a 7-acre (2.8 ha) mixed-use development west of Park Street named The Atrium was built of residential, leisure and retail buildings with wide pedestrianised areas and 683 public parking spaces. Its 217 mid-rise apartments split into courtyards in the Barcelona style. Fourteen new retail units face directly onto Park Street, opposite the Main Square shopping centre. Park Street has been pedestrianised and landscaped as part of the development. Leisure facilities include a nine-screen cinema, a bowling alley, a health and fitness club, cafés and restaurants. Various elements of The Atrium were opened during 2008, with the final elements, the main cinema and bowling alley, opening in October and November 2008, respectively.

In 2009, the town's households were named by Experian as having the highest carbon footprint in the UK, estimated at 28.05 tonnes per household per year (compared to 18.36 tonnes for the lowest, South Shields).

== Local and national government ==
Camberley is in the parliamentary constituency of Surrey Heath and was represented at Westminster from May 2005 to July 2024 by Conservative Michael Gove. After stepping down in the 2024 election Gove was replaced by Al Pinkerton of the Liberal Democrats

Surrey County Council, headquartered in Reigate, is elected every four years. Camberley is represented by three councillors; one for each of the "Camberley East", "Camberley West" and "Heatherside and Parkside" divisions.

Elections to Surrey Heath take place every four years. Three councillors represent "Heatherside" ward and two councillors are elected to each of the "Old Dean", "Parkside", "St Michael's", "St Paul's", "Town" and "Watchetts" wards. The Brough of Surrey Heath is twinned with Sucy-en-Brie, France and with Bietigheim-Bissingen, Germany.

== Demography and housing ==
2011 Census homes
Ward	Detached	Semi-detached	Terraced	Flats and apartments
Heatherside	1,282	291	630	127
Old Dean	73	966	289	428
Parkside	1,471	532	146	182
St Michaels	444	591	185	846
St Pauls	1,728	88	49	150
Town	800	293	235	576
Watchetts	683	625	179	441

The average level of accommodation in the region composed of detached houses was 28%, the average that was apartments was 22.6%. The remaining households not accounted for above were temporary/caravans and shared households.

2011 Census Key Statistics
Output area	Population	Households	Owned outright	Owned with a loan	hectares
Heatherside (ward)	6,049	2,344	820	1,196	177
Old Dean	4,636	1,769	314	532	304
Parkside	6,180	2,360	1,007	1,081	273
St Michaels	5,197	2,181	545	713	202
St Pauls	5,790	2,089	863	1,039	247
Town	4,912	2,009	619	632	263
Watchetts	5,152	1,930	588	727	212

The proportion of households in the civil parish who owned their home outright compares to the regional average of 35.1%. The proportion who owned their home with a loan compares to the regional average of 32.5%. The remaining percentage is made up of rented dwellings (plus a negligible percentage of households living rent-free).

== Economy ==
Camberley's town centre is host to The Square shopping centre, controversially purchased by Surrey Heath Borough Council for £110 million in 2016. This is a late 1980s development. The High Street has a number of shops as well as bars and clubs. There are a number of secondary shopping streets including Park Street, Princess Way and parts of London Road, including the "Atrium" development. Camberley's town centre is suffering a decline in footfall and increases in vacancies as shoppers in affluent areas move their spending online and towards leisure and experience activities as opposed to traditional retail.

Major employers include Siemens, which moved its UK headquarters to the area in 2007. Burlington Group who moved into Watchmoor Park in 2009 and Sun Microsystems, until they were taken over by Oracle in 2010, whose UK headquarters was located just across the Hampshire border in Minley next to the M3 motorway at junction 4a. Krispy Kreme UK are based in Albany Park, an industrial estate just outside Camberley in nearby Frimley.

== Public services ==
=== Utilities ===
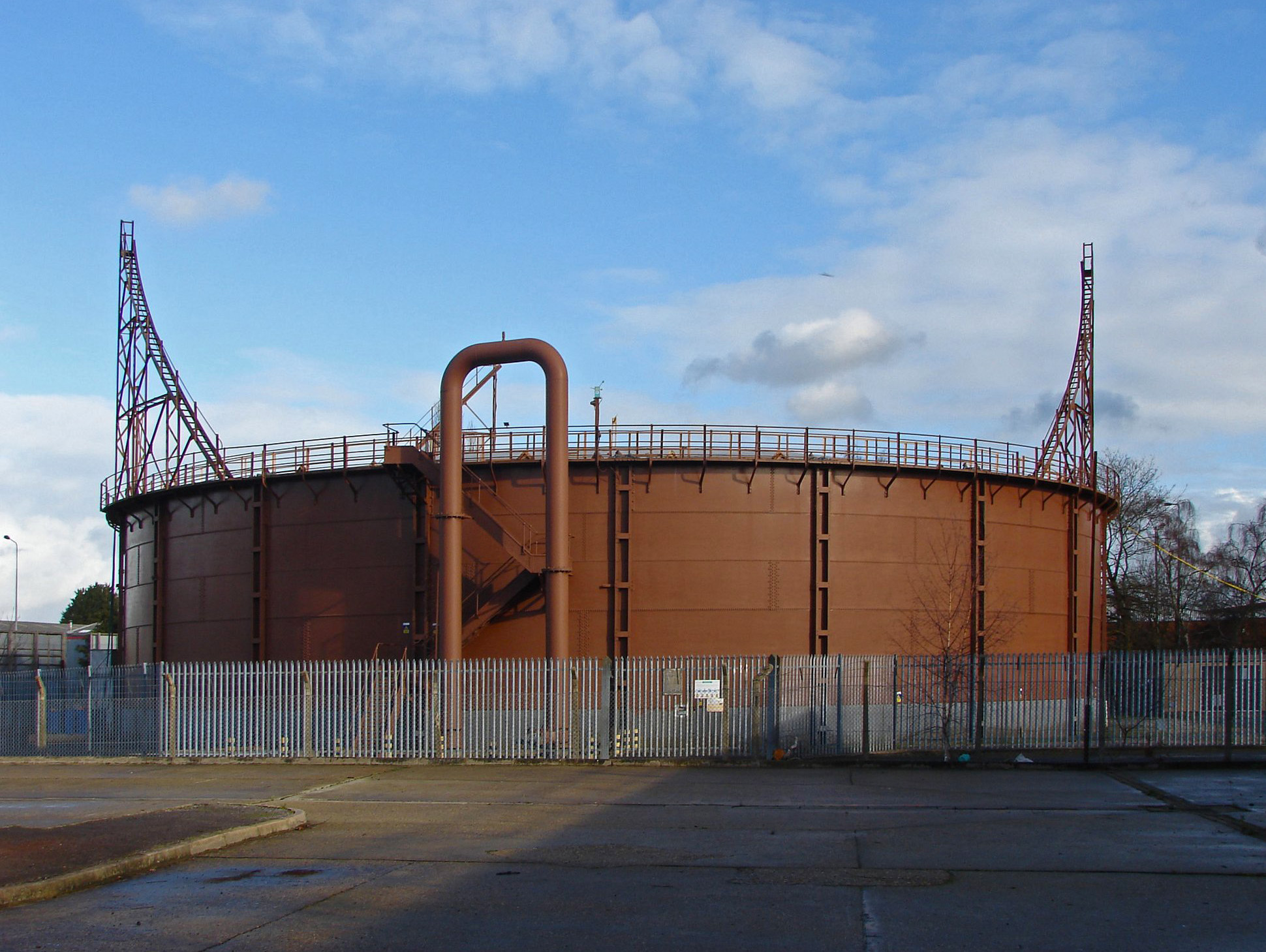
A gas holder at Yorktown in 2014

==== Gas ====
The York Town and Blackwater Gas and Coke Company Limited was formed in 1859 under the Joint Stock Companies Act 1856 to supply gas to Yorktown, Surrey and Blackwater, Hampshire. The York Town and Blackwater Gas Order 1890 extended the supply area of the company, and the York Town and Blackwater Gas Order 1899 authorised the building of a second gasworks. It opened its gasworks in Yorktown, south of London Road, near Blackwater Bridge, in November 1862.

York Town and Blackwater Gas Act 1904
- Act of Parliament
- Parliament of the United Kingdom
- Long title: An Act for incorporating and conferring powers on the York Town and Blackwater Gas Company and for other purposes.
- Citation: 4 Edw. 7. c. xxxvi

Dates
- Royal assent: 24 June 1904

Text of statute as originally enacted

Street lighting in Camberley was initially provided by oil lamps, but gas lamps were installed from 1900. In around 1903, the works began to supply the Royal Military College at Sandhurst. (Note: The earliest gas lights at the Royal Military College were installed in the mid-1850s, although the exact date is unknown. The college gasworks, on Marshall Road, closed in 1903 and thereafter gas was supplied from Yorktown.) In 1904, a short branch line was authorised by the York Town and Blackwater Gas Act 1904 (4 Edw. 7. c. xxxvi). The line was laid from the South Eastern Railway south of Blackwater station, enabling the coal required to be supplied by train. The York Town and Blackwater Gas Act 1904 dissolved the limited company, and incorporated it as the statutory York Town and Blackwater Gas Company. It also extended the authorised supply area to cover Sandhurst and Crowthorne.

York Town and Blackwater Gas and Electricity Act 1928
- Act of Parliament
- Parliament of the United Kingdom
- Long title: An Act to authorise the York Town and Blackwater Gas Company to consolidate and convert the existing capital of the Company and to raise additional capital to change the name of the Company and for other purposes.
- Citation: 18 & 19 Geo. 5. c. xlii

Dates
- Royal assent: 2 July 1928

Text of statute as originally enacted

The company was renamed to the Yorktown (Camberley) and District Gas and Electricity Company by section 42 of the York Town and Blackwater Gas and Electricity Act 1928 (18 & 19 Geo. 5. c. xlii), to reflect that it was supplying both utilities.

Yorktown (Camberley) and District Gas and Electricity Act 1929
- Act of Parliament
- Parliament of the United Kingdom
- Long title: An Act to provide for the transfer of the gas undertaking of the mayor aldermen and burgesses of the borough of Wokingham to the Yorktown (Camberley) and District Gas and Electricity Company and to confer further powers on such company and for other purposes.
- Citation: 19 & 20 Geo. 5. c. xxxiv

Dates
- Royal assent: 10 May 1929

Text of statute as originally enacted

The Yorktown (Camberley) and District Gas and Electricity Act 1929 (19 & 20 Geo. 5. c. xxxiv) authorised the company to acquire the Woking Corporation Gasworks, at a cost of £35,600. The Woking Corporation Gasworks had been acquired by the corporation, under the Wokingham Gas Order 1894, from the Wokingham Gas and Coke Company, which had been founded in 1838. It had a gasworks at the junction of Finchamstead Road and Carey Road.

The works came under the control of the Southern Gas Board in 1949 and closed in 1969.

==== Electricity ====
York Town and Blackwater Gas (Electric Lighting, &c.) Act 1909
- Act of Parliament
- Parliament of the United Kingdom
- Long title: An Act to empower the York Town and Blackwater Gas Company to supply electricity and to confer further powers on them and for other purposes.
- Citation: 9 Edw. 7. c. xxxiii

Dates
- Royal assent: 16 August 1909

The York Town and Blackwater Gas (Electric Lighting, &c.) Act 1909 (9 Edw. 7. c. xxxiii) authorised the York Town and Blackwater Gas Company to expand into the supply of electricity to the area. Unlike most towns in Surrey, Camberley did not have its own power station and instead, electricity was purchased on the wholesale market and was distributed locally.

==== Water ====
The Frimley and Farnborough District Water Company was formed in 1893 and began to supply Camberley four years later. Water was extracted from the chalk aquifer and was piped to a filtration plant at Frimley Green, before being pumped to a service reservoir on Frith Hill. In 1893, the Basingstoke Canal Company agreed that the water company could abstract up to 910,000 L (200,000 imp gal) per day from the canal, at a cost of 1 penny per 4,500 L (1,000 imp gal). In 2023, the drinking water supply for Camberley is provided by South East Water.

==== Sewage ====
Initially, wastewater from Camberley was disposed of in cesspits or discharged to local streams. In the mid-1880s a drainage system was installed, leading to a sewage farm at Yorktown. Following a report in 1902, which condemned the state of the town sewers, new pipework was installed and a new wastewater treatment works opened in Yorktown in 1907. In 2023, Camberley Sewage Treatment Works is operated by Thames Water.

==== Postal service ====
The postal service to Yorktown began in 1844 and the first postmaster was appointed in 1890. The telephone service to Camberley commenced in April 1897.

=== Emergency services and healthcare ===
The first police station was opened in 1892 on the corner of Portesbury Road and the High Street. In 1910, the local force had a total of eight officers. In 1971, the station moved to the east, but remained on Portesbury Road. The 1971 station closed in 2011. The building was demolished in 2016 for the construction of new houses and flats. In 2023, the nearest police station to Camberley is at Aldershot, operated by Hampshire and Isle of Wight Constabulary. The nearest counter service run by Surrey Police is at the Woking Borough Council offices.

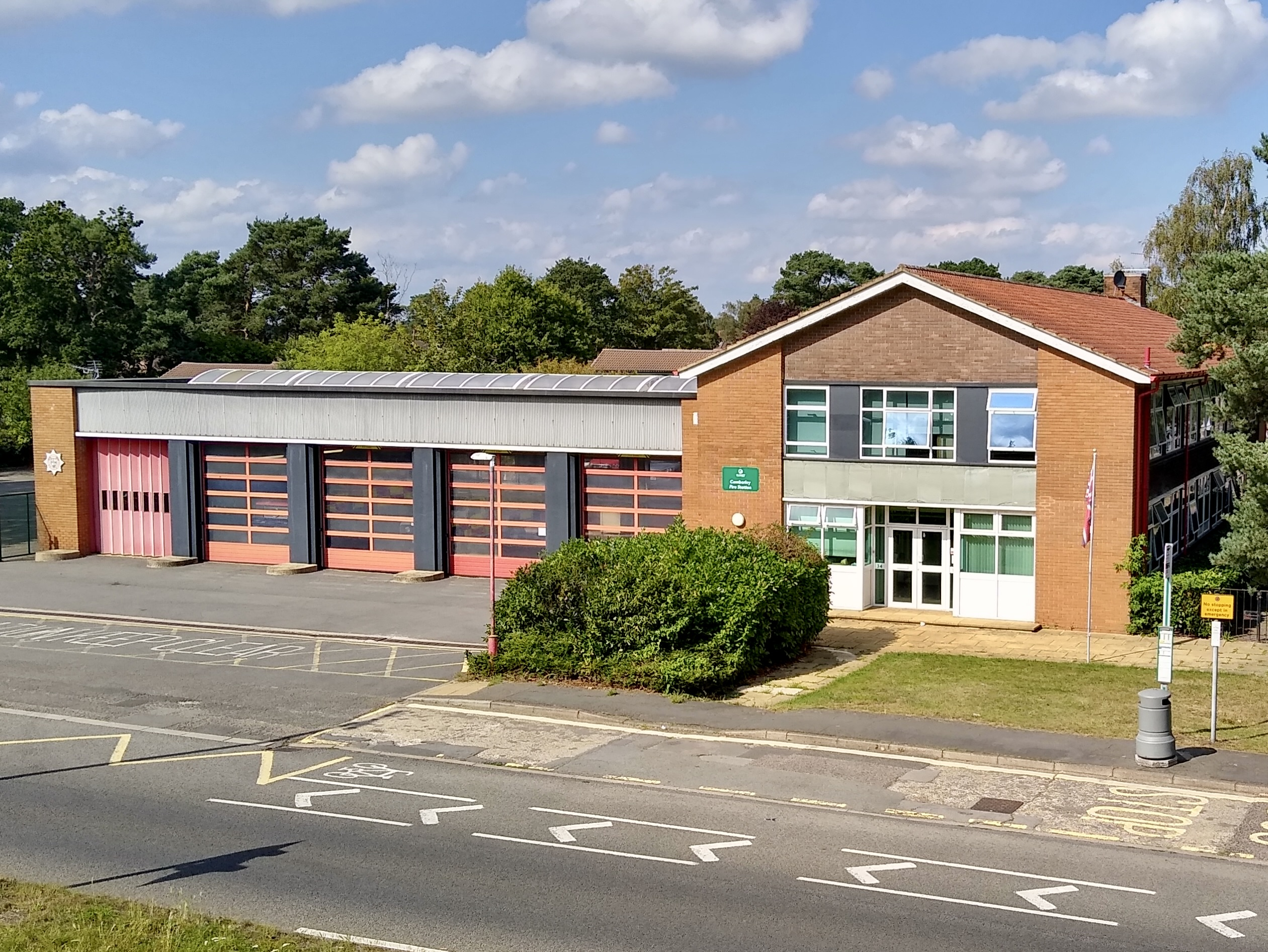
Camberley Fire Station

Camberley Fire Brigade was founded in May 1889 and was initially equipped with a hand-operated Merryweather pump. In 1900, the brigade moved to The Avenue and relocated to the current station in London Road in 1967. In 2023, the local fire authority is Surrey County Council and the statutory fire service is Surrey Fire and Rescue Service.

An ambulance service is recorded in Camberley in 1898. Initially it operated with a horse-drawn vehicle, but the service was equipped with a motorised ambulance during the 1920s. Patients were charged a fee for using the service, which was affiliated to the St John Ambulance and the British Red Cross. In 2023, the nearest ambulance station to Camberley is at Farnborough.

In 2023, the nearest hospital is Frimley Park Hospital around 1.4 mi (2.3 km) from Camberley. There are three GP surgeries in the town, on Upper Gordon, Park and Frimley Roads.

== Transport ==
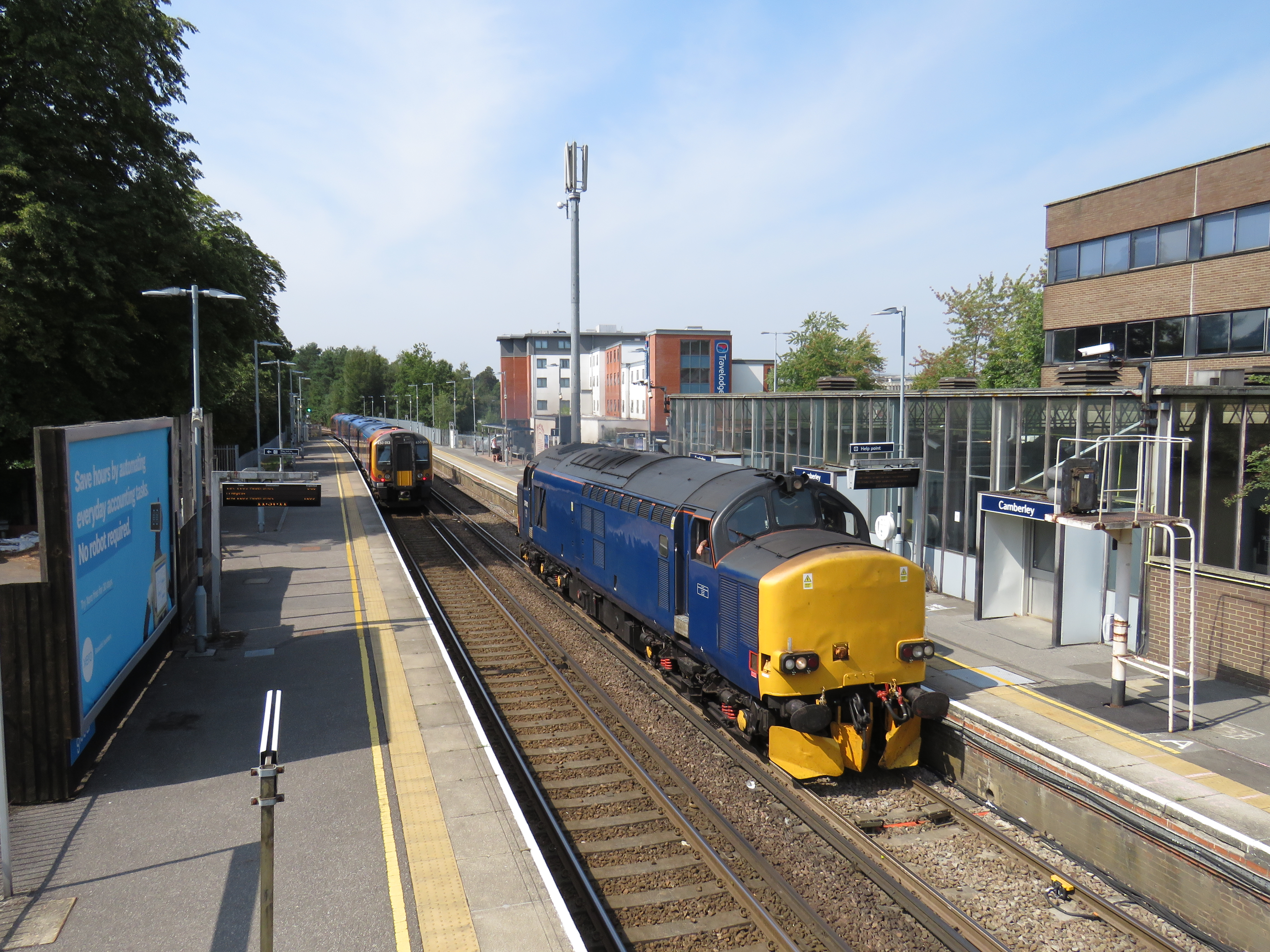
Camberley station

Camberley railway station is immediately south of the town centre and is managed by South Western Railway, which operates all services. Trains run to Ascot via Bagshot (extended to and from London Waterloo during peak periods) and to Aldershot via Frimley (a few trains continue to Guildford). A 2017 infrastructure assessment commissioned by the borough council notes that rail journey times to London from Camberley are slow (c. 72 – c. 80 minutes) and that many local residents choose to drive to Brookwood, Farnborough (Main) and Sunningdale for faster, direct services. (Note: The 2013 Surrey Rail Strategy identified the possibility of reinstating the Sturt Road Chord, allowing trains from Camberley to join the South West Main Line between Farnborough and Brookwook. A 2016 study noted that the rail infrastructure east of Woking was already operating at capacity in peak periods, meaning that, even if the junction was rebuilt, it might not be possible for trains from Surrey Heath to run direct to London Waterloo via this route.) Blackwater railway station is immediately to the west of Yorktown and is managed by Great Western Railway, which operates all services. Trains run to Reading via Wokingham and to Gatwick Airport via Guildford.

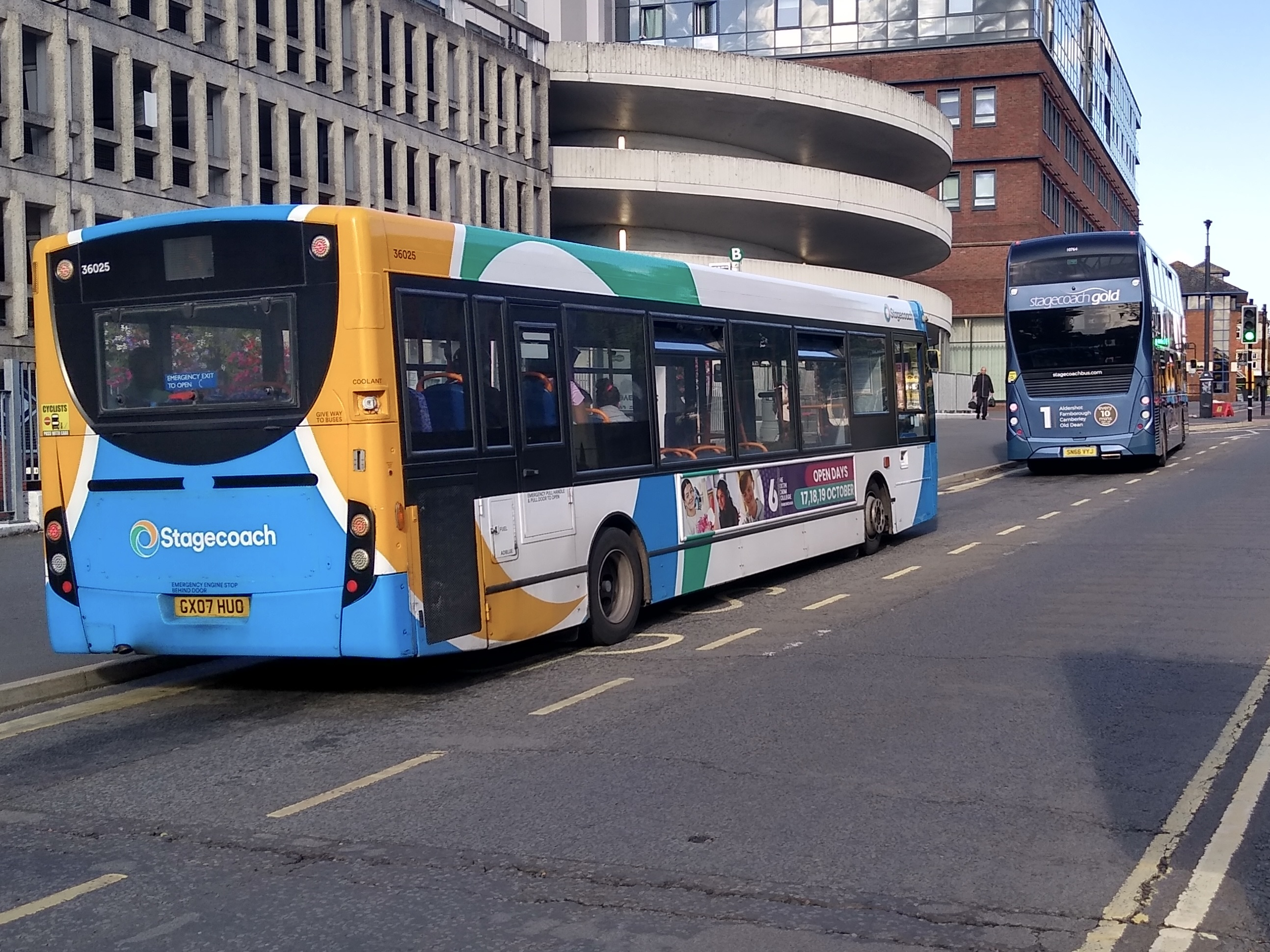
Pembroke Broadway bus stops

Camberley is linked by bus to local destinations in west Surrey, north-east Hampshire and south-east Berkshire. Companies operating routes through the town include: Thames Valley Buses to Bracknell, Arriva Guildford & West Surrey to Guildford via Woking, Stagecoach South to Aldershot and Farnborough, and White Bus to Ascot and Staines-upon-Thames.

The M3 runs to the south of Camberley and is accessed via junction 4 at the south-western corner of the town. The stretch of the motorway through the Borough of Surrey Heath was upgraded to a smart motorway in 2017. The other major roads in the town are the A30, which runs roughly parallel to the motorway between Hounslow and Basingstoke, and the A331 Blackwater Valley relief road. Yorktown and east Camberley are linked to Frimley by the B3411 and A325 respectively. Old Dean is linked to Deepcut via the B3015.

A £1.2M shared cycle and footpath between Blackwater station and Watchmoor was completed in 2017 and a new bike-parking facility opened in Princess Way in the town centre in 2021. In the same year, Surrey County Council consulted on a scheme to improve local cycling infrastructure, focused on a route between Camberley and Frimley.

== Education ==
=== Early schools ===
The first school to open in the Camberley area, a National school, was established in 1818. Originally housed in a cottage close to the Royal Military College, one of its early pupils was the composer, Arthur Sullivan. In 1871, it moved to a site adjacent to the St Michael's Church vicarage. By 1872, there was a second school in Yorktown, which may have been a school for nonconformists, although its origins are uncertain.

The first Cordwalles School was founded in Elliot Place, Greenwich, in 1805 and one of its early pupils was the future prime minister, Benjamin Disraeli. In 1875, it moved to Cordwalls Farm, Maidenhead, from which it acquired its name. The school merged with Kingswood School, Camberley, which had been established on part of the former Collinwood Estate in 1910. In 1939, the school was evacuated to Market Drayton, but did not return to Camberley at the end of the war. The site was used by Ballard School in the 1950s.

Barossa Secondary School began teaching its first pupils in September 1963, although the official opening ceremony did not take place for another two years. The secondary modern school, on the Old Dean estate, was constructed on a site adjacent to the former Ballard School.

Frimley and Camberley Grammar School opened in 1931 on Frimley Road. The school moved to the former Ballard School, adjacent to the then new Barossa Secondary School in 1967. The original site was then used as an annex for France until 1971. The buildings have since been used for Watchetts School, now South Camberley Primary and Nursery School.

=== Current schools ===
Kings International College was opened as France Hill Secondary School in 1947. For the first eleven years, it was based at Franz Hill House, which had been built c. 1840. The school moved to its current location on Watchetts Drive in 1959 and adopted its present name in 2001.

Collingwood College was formed in 1971 from the merger of Camberley Grammar School, Barossa Secondary School and Bagshot Secondary School. It became a self-governing Technology College in September 1994 and gained Foundation status in September 1999.

The current Cordwalles School was founded in 1962 and was officially opened on 5 March 1963. Initially a primary and infants school, it became a middle school in 1971, before reverting to a junior school again in 1994.

=== Relocated schools ===
The Royal Albert Orphan Asylum was founded in Camberley in 1864 and the first 100 children were admitted in December of that year. Originally a mixed institution, girls were not admitted after 1903. It was renamed the Royal Albert School in 1942 and its management was merged with that of the Royal Alexandra School in 1948. The following year, an Act of Parliament was passed to formally amalgamate the two institutions, creating The Royal Alexandra and Albert School. Pupils from both schools were transferred in stages from their original sites to new accommodation at Gatton Park between 1848 and 1954. The former school buildings in Camberley were damaged by fire in 1987 and were demolished in 1994. The grounds were split in two by the construction of the M3.

Elmhurst Ballet School was founded as the Mortimer School of Dancing in 1923. It adopted its current name in 1947, taken from Elmhurst House in Camberley, where it was based. During the Second World War, Sadlers Wells and Rambert Schools were evacuated to Elmhurst and the pupils of all three schools performed to entertain soldiers billeted locally and to raise money for the war effort. After the end of the war, pupil numbers began to expand (from 60 in 1933 to 240 in 1947) and a purpose-built theatre was constructed, opening in May 1960. Much of the rest of the school was rebuilt during the 1970s and the new buildings were opened by Princess Margaret in 1979. The school relocated to Birmingham in 2004, with the aim of providing professional dance training outside of the south-east of England. The former school site in Camberley was redeveloped as Elmhurst Court.

== Places of worship ==
=== Anglican churches ===
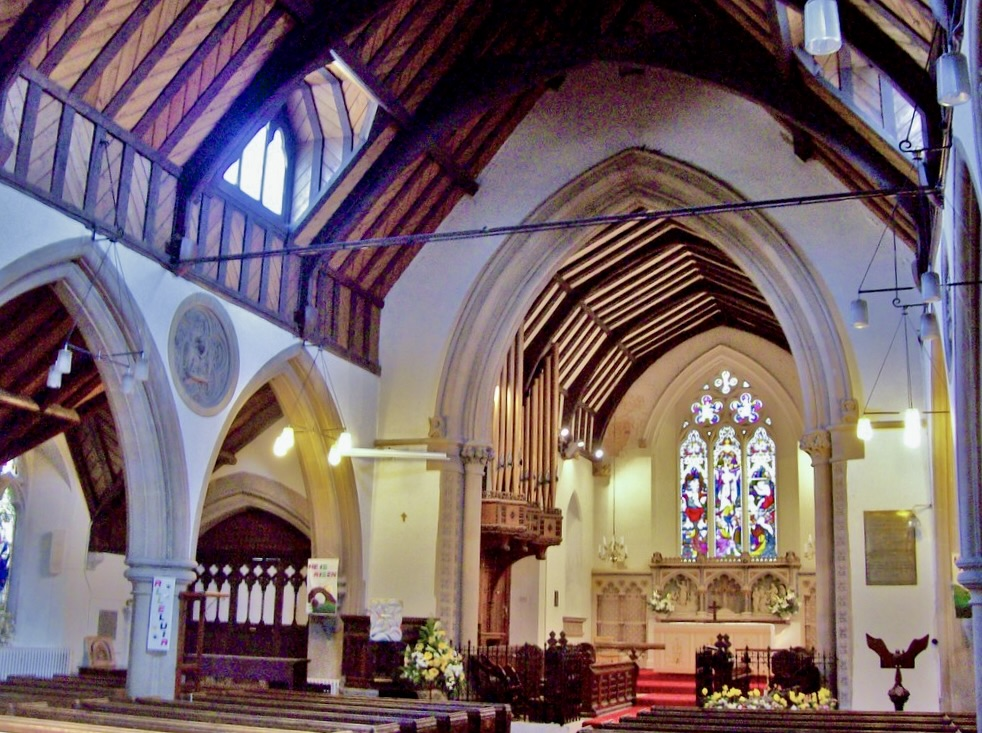
Interior of St Michael's Church

St Michael's Church was designed by the architect, Henry Woodyer, and is constructed in local Frimley stone. The foundation stone was laid in September 1848 and the church was consecrated in May 1851. The church was built as a nave only, but Woodyer's design incorporated masonry arches in the walls, which could be knocked through when the building was expanded. The chancel was added in 1858 by George Gilbert Scott and aisles were built to a design by Charles Buckeridge in 1864-65. The tower, in Bargate stone, was added in 1891, and is topped by a broach spire, which reaches a height of 38 m (125 ft) above ground level.

St Paul's Church was designed by W. D. Caröe in 1902 and elements of the building are influenced by Swedish architectural trends of the period. The chancel is topped by a wood-shingled spire. One of the stained-glass windows is dedicated to Doveton Sturdee, a local resident who died in 1925. St Mary's Church, designed by E. E. Lofting, was consecrated in 1937 and was built as a daughter church to St Paul's. The building has a small tower and is constructed of brick and concrete with a stucco finish.

St Martin's Church, dedicated to Martin of Tours, was consecrated in 1978. The construction was paid for in part with money raised from the sale of the site of the former St George's Church, which had closed in 1966. Proceeds from the sale of copies of the John Betjeman poem, A Subaltern's love song, which mentions Camberley, were also used to fund the building work. The congregation of Heatherside Parish Church began meeting in January 1977. Heatherside became an ecclesiastical parish in September 2000.

=== Other places of worship ===
St Tarcisius Church was built in 1923-26 as a memorial to Catholic military officers, who had died in the First World War. It was designed by Frederick Walters and is constructed of Bargate stone with Bath stone dressings. Several of the stained-glass windows were designed by Paul Woodroffe.

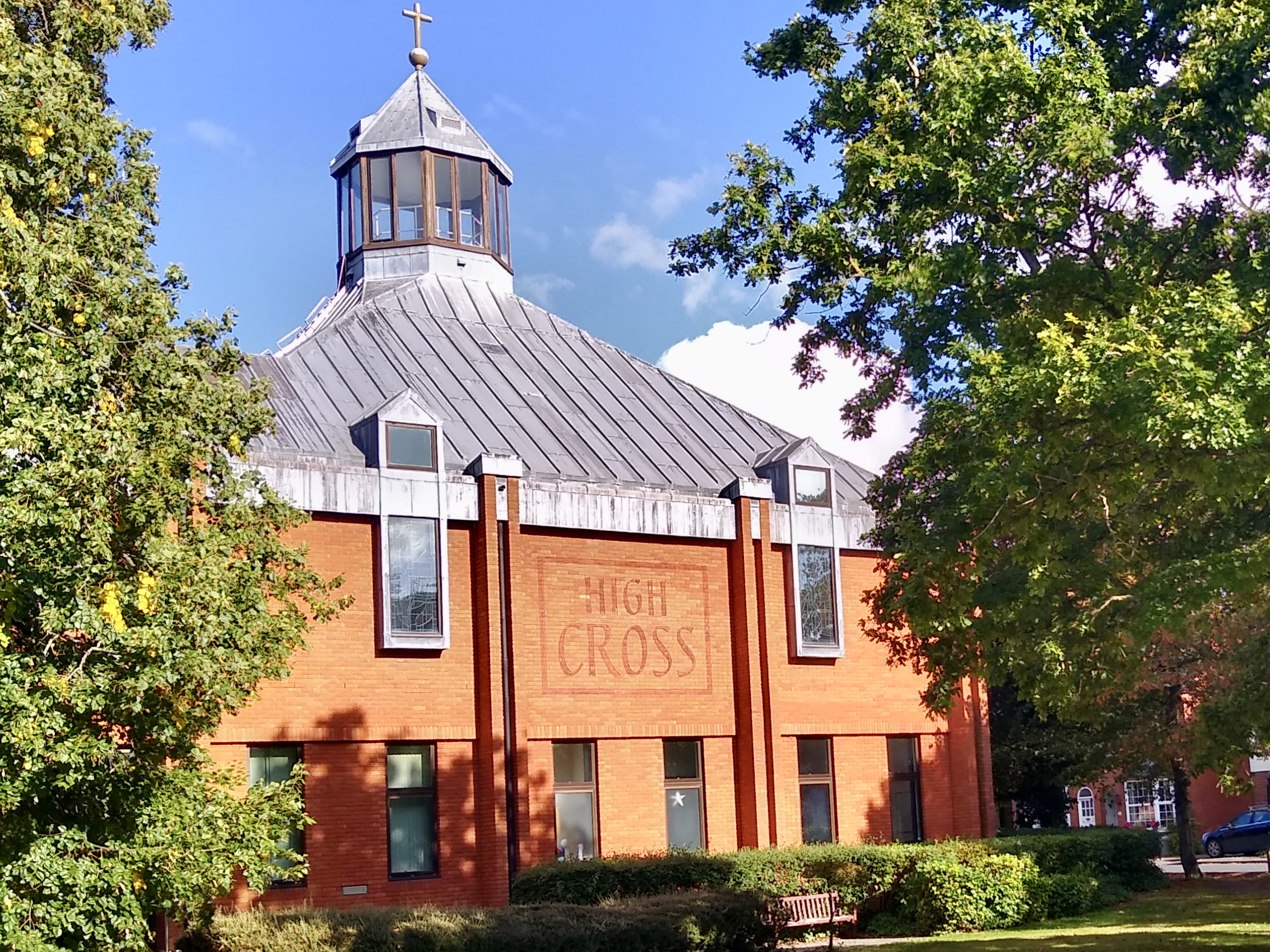
High Cross Church

High Cross Church opened in Knoll Road in March 1990. It replaced the Congregational Church, which was demolished in 1990 to make way for the College Gardens shopping complex, and the Methodist Church, demolished in October of the same year.

The local Bengali Welfare Association established an Islamic centre in the former St Gregory's Roman Catholic School building in 1996. In 2010, a planning application to demolish the school and replace it with a purpose-built mosque was rejected by the borough council. The plans were rejected again the following year, following a public inquiry.

== Culture ==
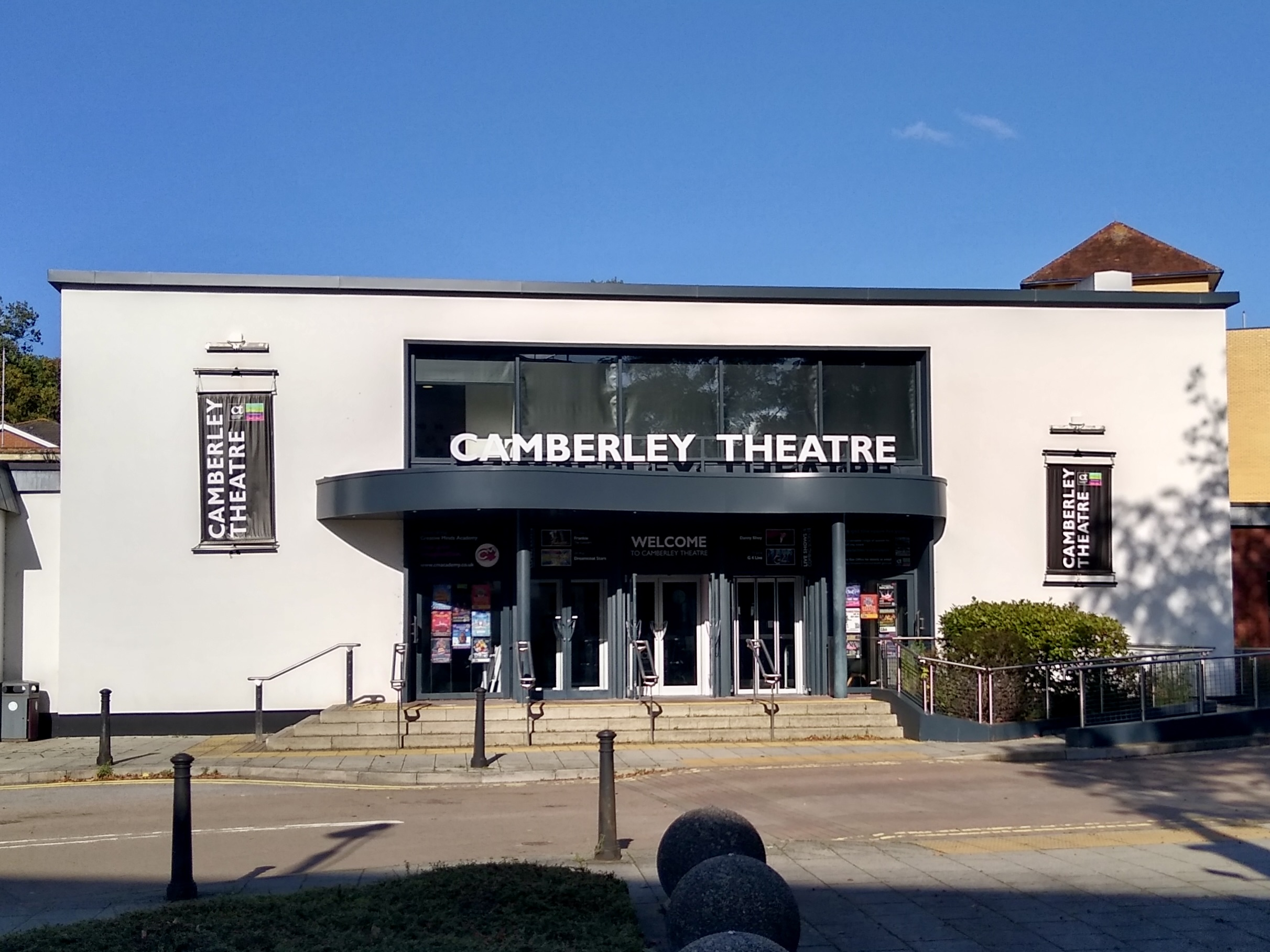
Camberley Theatre

Camberley Theatre, in Knoll Road, opened as the Camberley Civic Hall on 1 October 1966. It closed in May 1995 for a £1.3M refurbishment and reopened as Camberley ArtsLink in November of the same year. In December 2001, the venue was again rebranded, adopting its current name. A second refurbishment, involving the rebuilding of the frontage, was completed in December 2021.

There are several works of public art in Camberley. The Concrete Elephant, adjacent to the London Road in Yorktown, was installed at the yard of Trollope & Colls in 1964. It had been commissioned for the Lord Mayor's Show the previous year and the artist, Barbara Jones, designed the sculpture using pipework from the company's product range. The current tenants of the site, HSS Hire, are required to maintain the artwork as part of their lease.

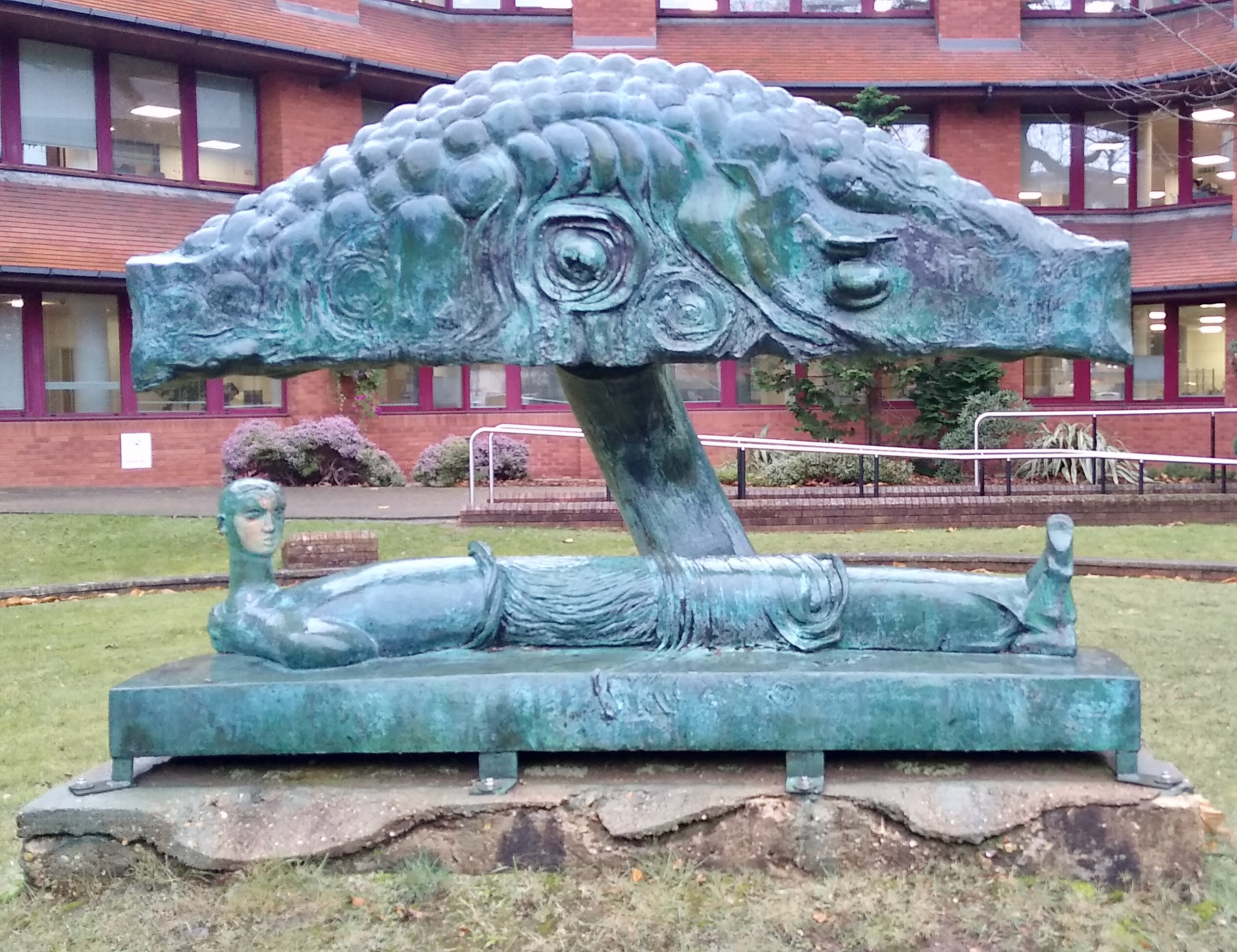
Into our first world by Ken Ford

Into Our First World, by Ken Ford, was unveiled outside the borough council offices in March 1993. The sculpture, cast in silicon bronze, depicts a figure reclining beneath a tree. It explores the relationship between humanity and the natural world, and its form echoes the sweet chestnut tree growing behind it. The Right Way, by Rick Kirby was unveiled outside the Atrium in January 2009. It depicts three metal figures pointing in different directions along Park Street and Obelisk Way.

== Sport ==
=== Venues ===
The London Road Recreation Ground opened in 1898 and was extended in 1931. During the early 19th century, the area had been used as a plant nursery until its purchase by the UDC in the 1890s. Watchetts Recreation Ground was part of the Watchetts House estate until 1927, when it was bought by the UDC. The ground was officially opened on 16 May 1931.

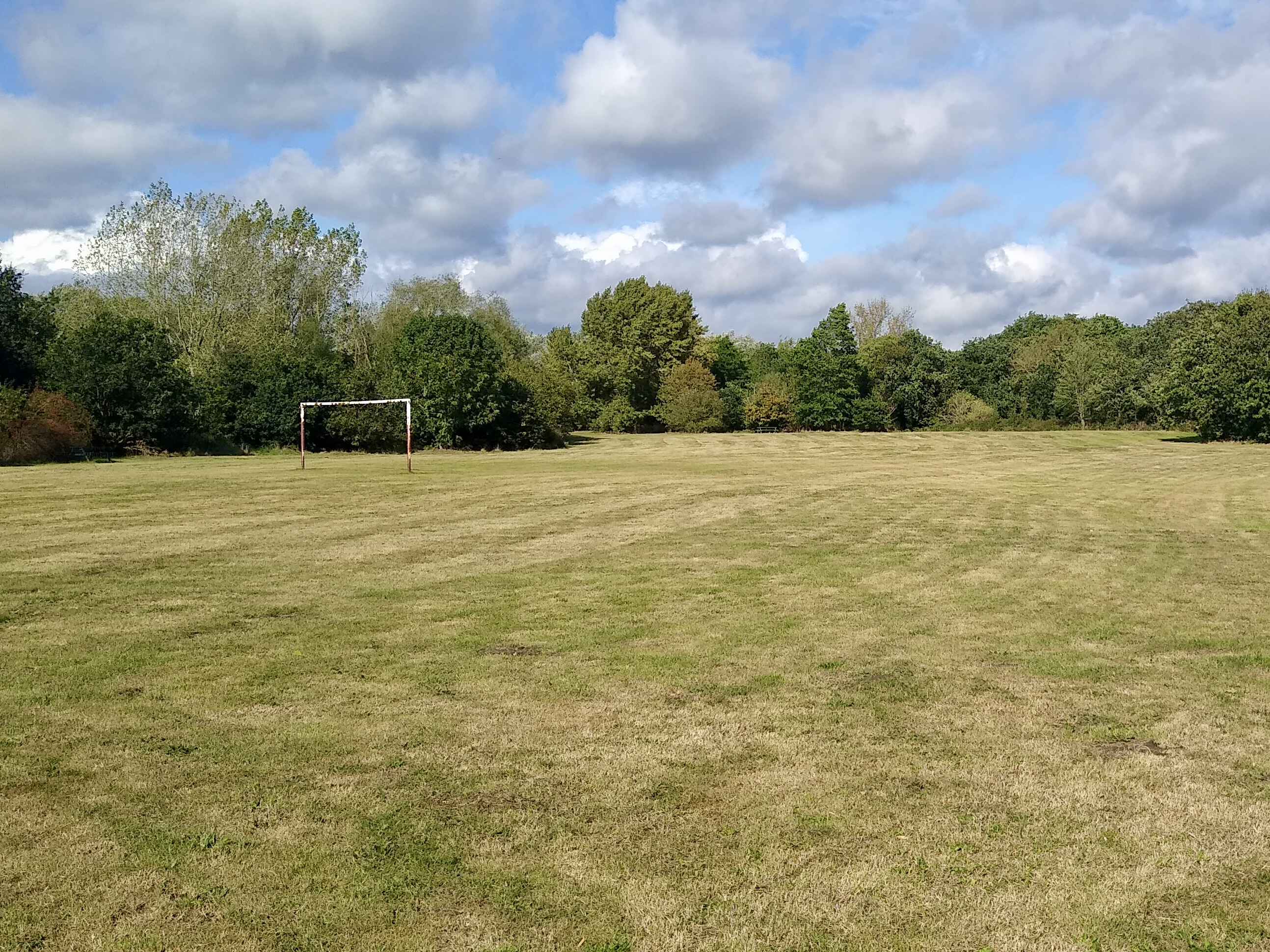
Crabtree Park

Until the 1990s, Crabtree Park was a rubbish dump. The landfill site was closed, the waste was capped and the area reopened as a recreation ground. The skate park was reopened in 2014, following a £25,000 refurbishment project.

Until the mid-1930s, Camberley residents used the Blackwater River to swim. The first purpose-built pool, the Blue Pool, was built on the London Road by a private company and opened in May 1934. The borough council took over the facility in 1973, but it closed three years later when essential repair works were found to be financially unviable. The Manor House flats were built on the site of the Blue Pool in the early 1980s.

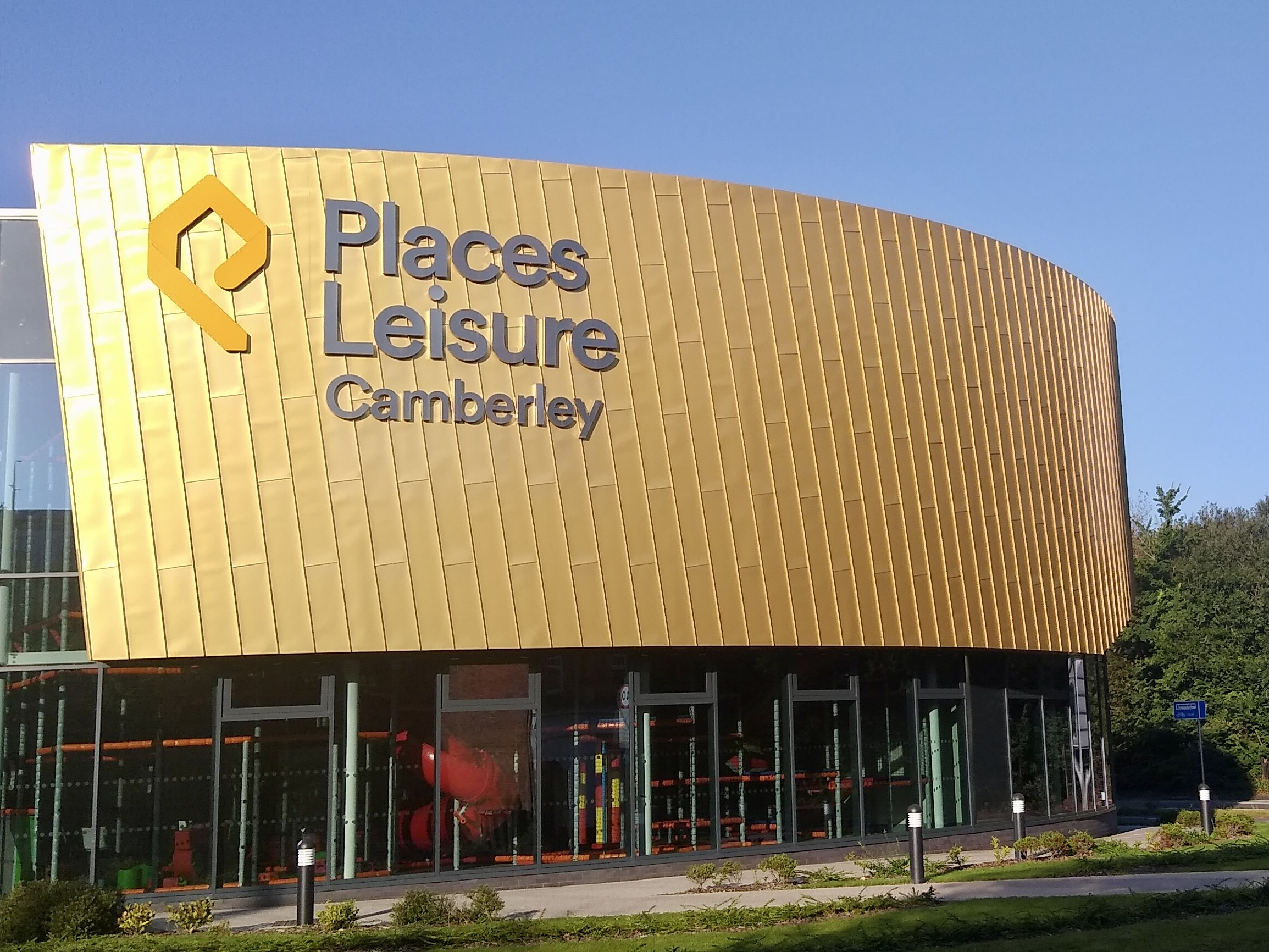
Camberley Leisure Centre

The Arena Leisure Centre was built on the north-eastern corner of the London Road Recreation Ground and opened in November 1984. The facility closed in August 2019 and was demolished. The new Arena Leisure Centre, on the same site as the previous centre, opened in July 2021. It has two swimming pools, a gym and three exercise studios. The centre is owned by the borough council and is operated by Places Leisure on a 25-year design, build, operate and maintain contract.

=== Organisations ===
The Camberley & Yorktown F. C. team of 1904–05

Camberley Town Football Club joined the Surrey Football Association in January 1896 and is thought to have been founded the previous year. It began as part of the St Michael’s Club, the social club associated with St Michael’s Church. The team was initially referred to as St Michael’s, Camberley and played its home games on meadow land in King’s Ride. The first recorded match took place in October 1896, against a team from the Royal Military College. By late 1900, the club was under financial pressure and was refounded as Camberley and Yorktown F. C. in January 1897. After two decades of moving between temporary home grounds, the club was established at Krooner Park in 1922.

The first cycling club to be founded in the area is recorded in a local directory of 1889. By 1904, the Camberley Wheelers had been formed and was organising meetings at the London Road Recreation Ground. In 1969, the club merged with Farnborough Cycling Club to form the Farnborough & Camberley Cycling Club.

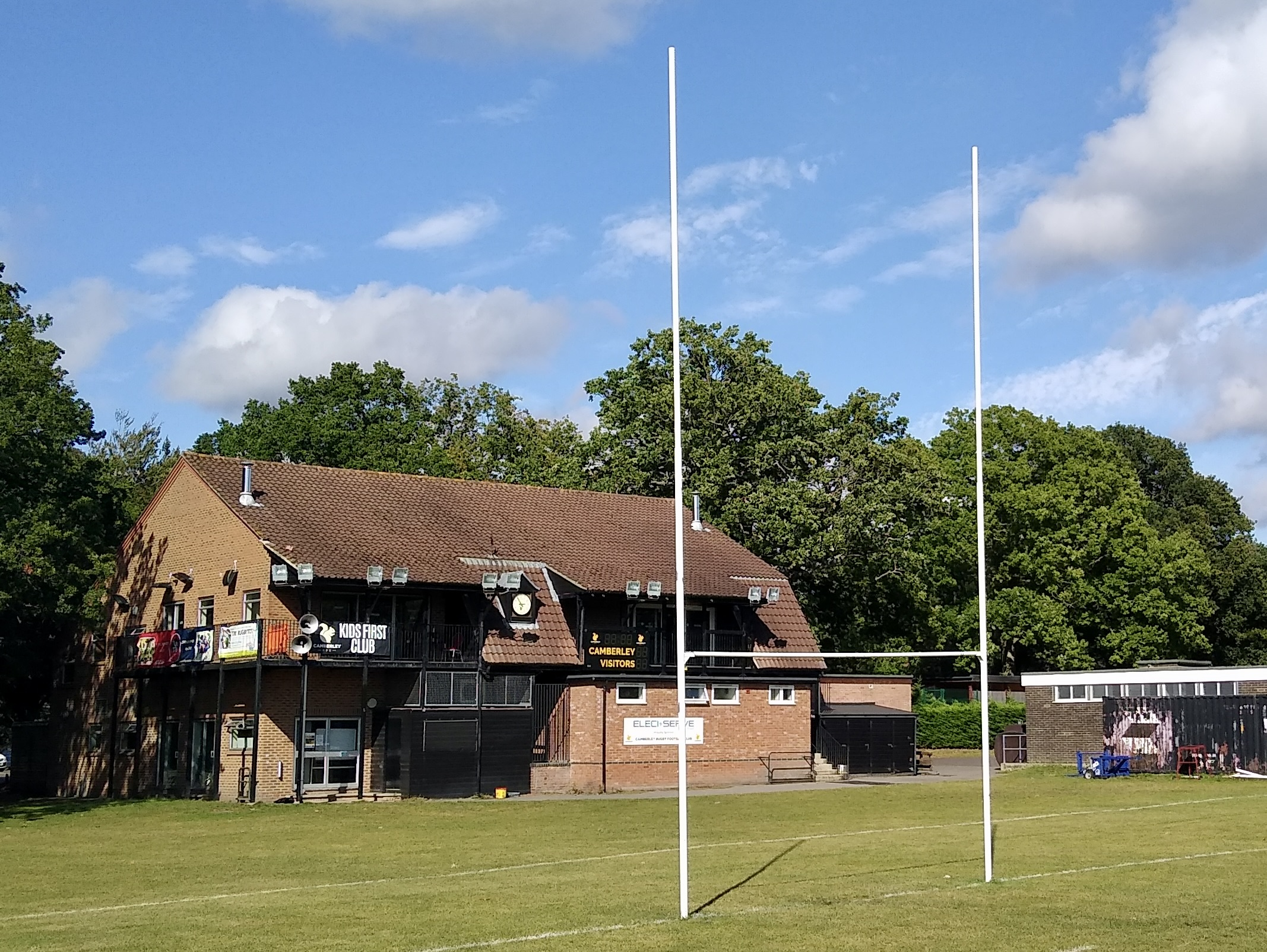
Camberley R.F.C. pavilion, Watchetts Recreation Ground

Camberley Rugby Football Club was founded in 1931 and played its first game at Watchetts Recreation Ground in October of that year. The club affiliated to the Surrey Rugby Football Union in 1933 and, like most other local teams, disbanded in September 1939. During the Second World War, the recreation ground was used to grow potatoes and it was not until the autumn of 1947 that club was able to resume. Initially Camberley R.F.C. had use of the cricket pavilion as tenants of the cricket club, but constructed their own clubhouse in 1970. In March 1973, the first team won the Surrey Cup.

Camberley Heath Golf Club was designed by Harry Colt and was formally opened by Prince Christian of Schleswig-Holstein on 1 January 1914. A project to regenerate the course, reinstating some of the original bunker designs, was undertaken in the mid-2010s. In 2020, the course was used as a location for third series of the BBC television drama, Killing Eve.

By the mid-1860s, there were two cricket teams in the area, one for Yorktown and one for Cambridge Town, and a match is recorded between the two in June 1865. They had merged by 1882, when the name "Camberley Cricket Club" was adopted. The club shut down at the start of the First World War, but was refounded in 1929 and began playing its home games at the Watchetts Recreation Ground the following year. Local cricket again ceased at the start of the Second World War, but a new club was founded in 1944 and the first match was played the following year. A new ground was leased from the Watchetts estate and the first home games were played there in 1951. The ground was officially opened in 1952 and was bought by the club the following year. Over the next three decades, the club sold off part of the land surrounding the ground to fund improvements to the pitch and pavilion. The first girls' team was launched in 2013.

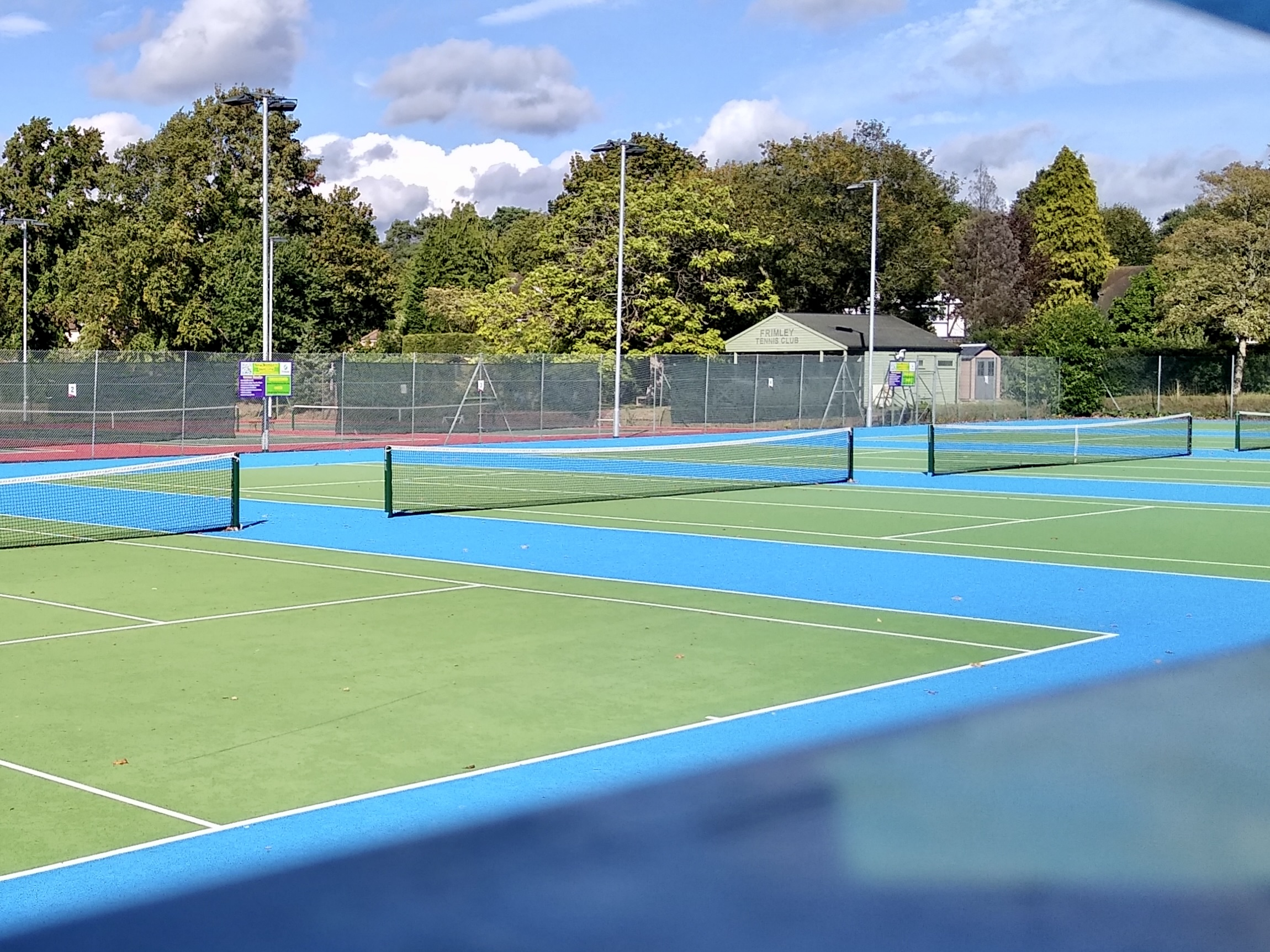
Frimley Tennis Club, Watchetts Recreation Ground

The first hockey club in Camberley was formed in 1898 and, by 1907, there were two clubs in the town. The present Camberley and Farnborough Hockey Club was founded in the 1950s and plays its home games at Kings International College. There are two tennis clubs in the area: Camberley Lawn Tennis Club is based at Southcote Park, which has five all-weather courts; Frimley Tennis Club is based at Watchetts Recreation Ground and has four outdoor courts.

== Notable buildings and landmarks ==
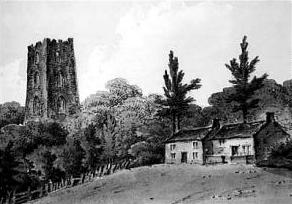
The first known depiction of the Obelisk, by John Hassell, dated 1812

The Camberley Obelisk is a square brick tower in the grounds of St Tarcissius School. Local legend states that it was built by John Norris c. 1750 – c. 1770, although Historic England gives a construction date of c. 1841. Originally the tower is thought to have been 30 m (100 ft) tall, but only the lower third remains standing. It may have been built as a folly or as a signalling tower.

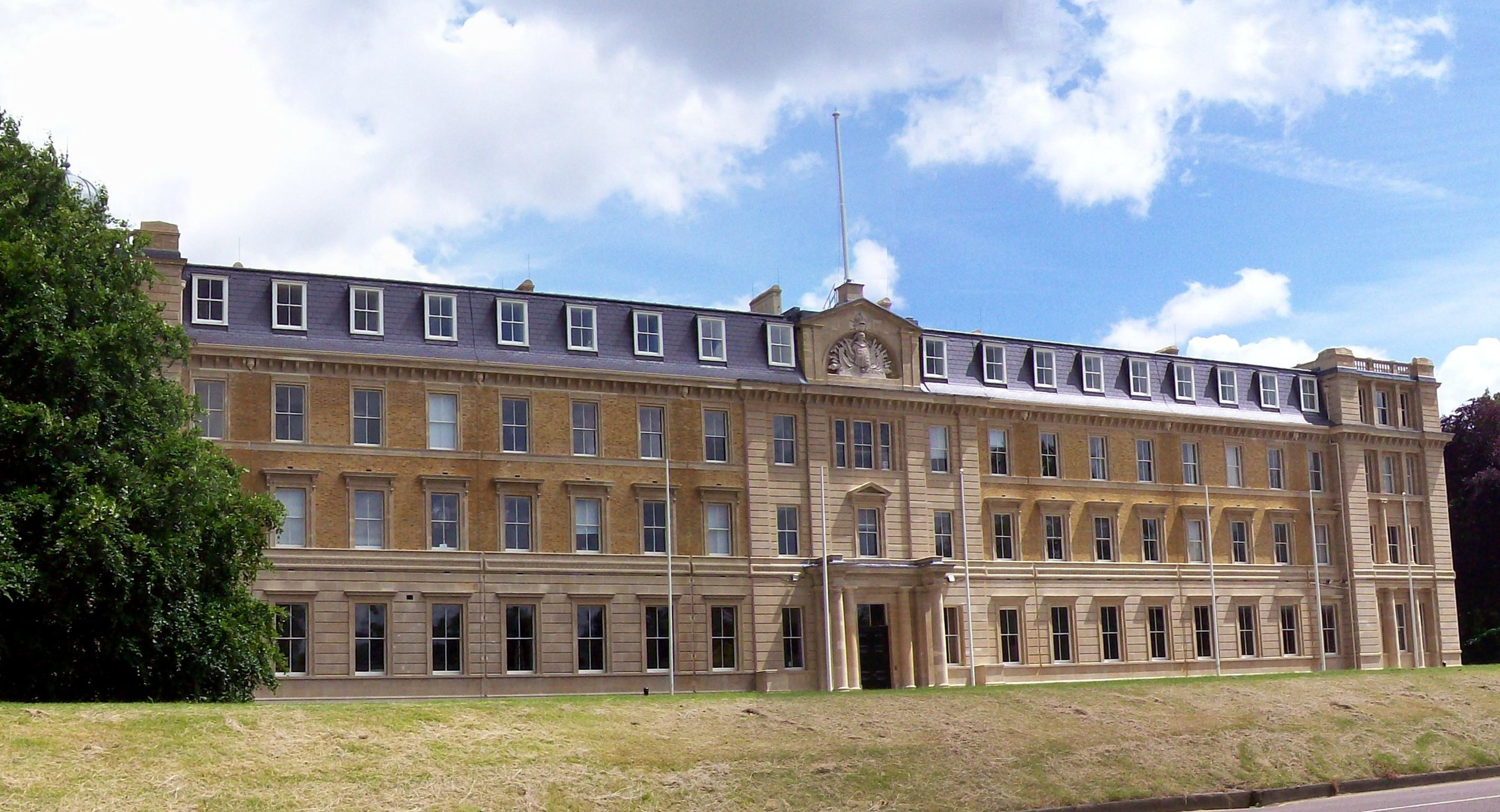
Staff College, Camberley

The Staff College, to the north of Camberley town centre, is part of the Joint Services Command and Staff College, which provides training and education for established officers in the British Armed Forces and civil servants in the Ministry of Defence. The institution has its origins in the Royal Military College, High Wycombe, which was founded in 1799. It moved to Farnham in 1813, relocating seven years later to the Royal Military College at Sandhurst. The Staff College building was designed by James Pennethorne and constructed in 1862. It was primarily built using London stock bricks, although the front elevation is partially faced with stone. The uppermost storey was added in 1913.

Camberley War Memorial was erected in 1922 at the southern entrance to the Royal Military Academy. It takes the form of a Latin cross, carved from granite. The names of 233 people who died in the First World War are recorded on two columns at the base of the cross and 140 who died in the Second World War are listed on four piers at the corners of the plinth. A stone, set into the pavement at the foot of the memorial, commemorates Victoria Cross recipient Garth Walford, who was born in Yorktown in 1882 and who died at Gallipoli in 1915.

== Notable people ==
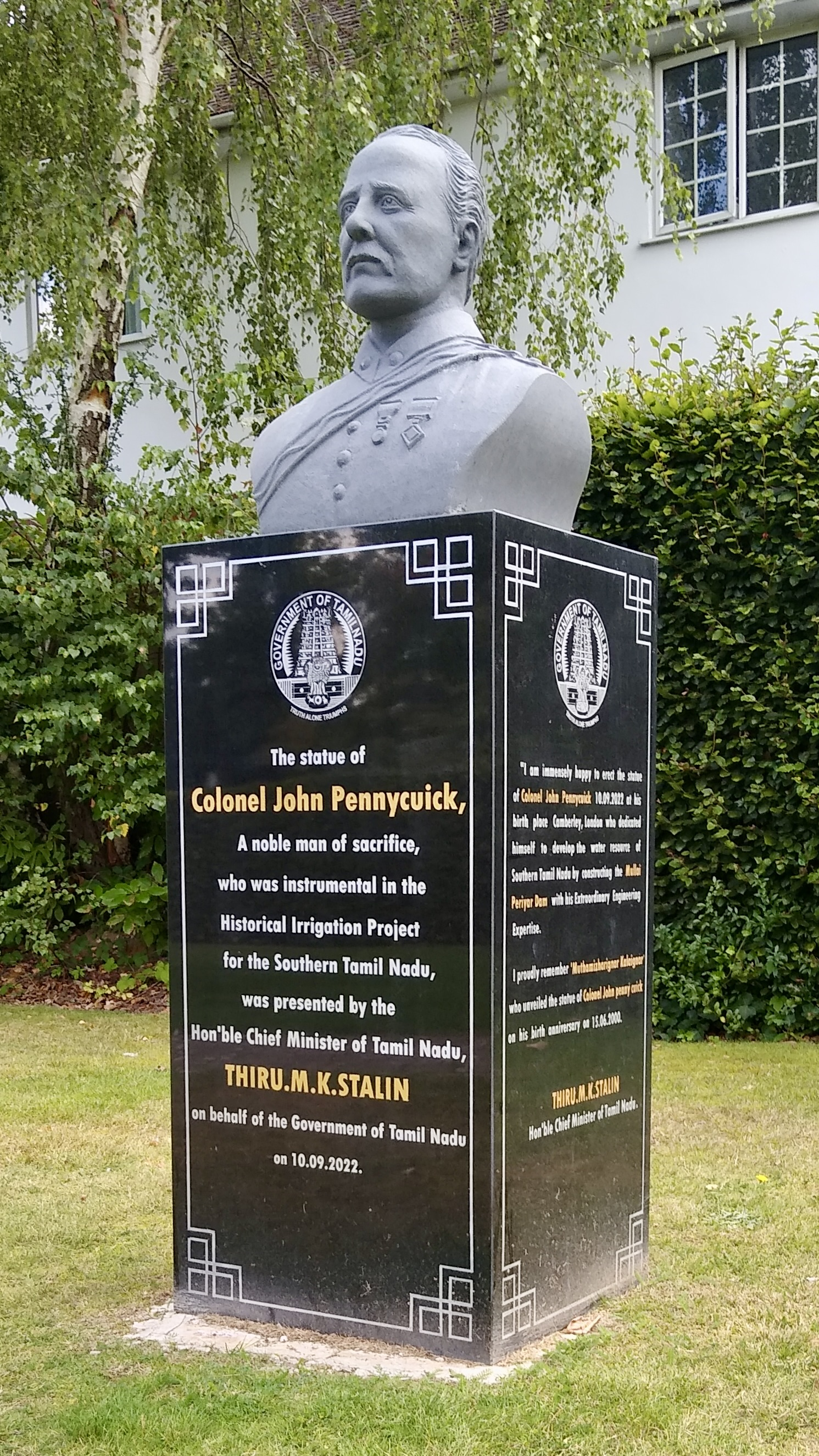
Bust of John Pennycuick, installed in the memorial garden at the London Road Recreation Ground in 2022

- John Pennycuick (1841–1911) engineer – died in Camberley
- Arthur Sullivan (1842–1900) composer – lived in Camberley between the ages of three and fifteen, and attended York Town School until the age of eight. He wrote The Golden Legend at Camberley in 1886
- Hosea Ballou Morse (1855–1934) historian of China – lived in Camberley from 1914 until his death
- Doveton Sturdee (1859–1925) lived in Camberley
- Vaughan Cornish (1862–1948) geographer – lived and died in Camberley
- Charles Wellington Furse (1868–1904) artist – lived in Camberley from 1900 until his death
- Frederick Twort (1877–1950) microbiologist – born, lived and died in Camberley
- Rick Wakeman (b. 1949) musician – lived in Camberley in the 1980s and was vice-president of Camberley Town F. C.
- George Saville (b. 1993) footballer – born in Camberley
- Simone Ashley (b. 1995) actress – born in Camberley
- Camberley Kate (1895 - 1979) dog fancier and eccentric - lived and died in Camberley

== Bibliography ==
- Barson, Graham, ed. (2007). Camberley and Yorktown between the wars. Britain in old photographs. Stroud: Sutton Publishing. ISBN 978-0-75-094540-0.
- Bennett, Mary Ann (2009). Camberley : A History. Chichester: Phillimore. ISBN 978-1-86-077557-4.
- Clarke, Ken (1988). Camberley in old picture postcards. Vol. 1. Zaltbommel: European Library. ISBN 90-2-884693-X.
- Clarke, Ken (1994). Camberley in old picture postcards. Vol. 2. Zaltbommel: European Library. ISBN 90-288-5790-7.
- Clarke, Ken, ed. (1995). Around Camberley. Stroud: Chalford Publishing Company. ISBN 978-0-75-240148-5.
- Clarke, Ken, ed. (2000). Around Camberley : Photographic memories. Salisbury: Francis Frith. ISBN 978-1-85-937222-7.
- Clarke, Ken (2005). The Royal Albert Orphanage and School. Bagshot: Surrey Heath Local History Club. ISBN 0-9509945-5-3.
- Crocker, Glenys (1999). Surrey's Industrial Past. Guildford: Surrey Industrial History Group. ISBN 978-0-95-239188-3.
- Defoe, Daniel (1742). A Tour thro' the Whole Island of Great Britain. Vol. I (3rd ed.). London: Osborn, J., Birt, S., Browne, D., Hodges, J., Millar, A., Whiston, J. and Robinson, J. OCLC 181833769.
- Elliott, John; Pritchard, John, eds. (2001). Henry Woodyer, Gentleman Architect. Reading: University of Reading. ISBN 978-0-70-491331-8.
- Greenwood, John; Carpenter, Susan (2013). Camberley Heath Golf Club. Chichester: Phillimore. ISBN 978-1-86-077739-4.
- Jackson, Hazelle (2004). Camberley : A history and celebration of the town. Salisbury: Francis Frith. ISBN 978-1-90-493814-9.
- Mitchell, Vic; Smith, Keith (1988). Reading to Guildford. Country rail routes. Midhurst: Middleton Press. ISBN 978-0-90-652047-5.
- Mitchell, Vic; Smith, Keith (1989). Branch lines around Ascot. Midhurst: Middleton Press. ISBN 978-0-90-652064-2.
- Ogley, Bob (1995). Surrey at war 1939-1945. Brasted Chart: Froglets. ISBN 978-1-87-233765-4.
- Poulter, George C. B. (1969). The history of Camberley. Camberley: Frimley and Camberley Urban District Council. ISBN 978-0-95-002690-9.
- Rice, Jennifer (1998). At your service : Elmhurst Ballet School. Camberley: Elmhurst Ballet School. OCLC 150681843.
- Sherlock, R. L.; Casey, R.; Holmes, S. C. A.; Wilson, V. (1960). London and the Thames Valley. British Regional Geology (3rd ed.). London: Institute of Geological Sciences.
- Stone, Mike, ed. (1981). 50 years of rugby 1931-1981 : Camberley R. F. C. Camberley: Camberley R. F. C.
- Stukeley, William (1776). Itinerarium Curiosum or an account of the antiquities and remarkable curiosities in nature or art observed in travels through Great Britain (2nd ed.). London: Baker and Leigh. Archived from the original on 30 December 2022.
- Thomas, Russell (2020). The manufactured gas industry. Research Report Series. Vol. 3. Historic England. ISSN 2059-4453. Archived from the original on 4 August 2023.
- Vine, P. A. L. (1994). London's lost route to Basingstoke (2nd ed.). Stroud: Sutton Publishing. ISBN 978-0-75-090359-2.
- Wellard, Gordon (1992). The story of Camberley 1798-1992 : The Victorian village that became a modern town. Camberley: Surrey Heath Local History Club. ISBN 978-0-95-145521-0.
